= 2013 AIBA World Boxing Championships – Welterweight =

Boxing competitions

The Welterweight competition at the 2013 AIBA World Boxing Championships was held from 16–26 October 2013. Boxers were limited to a weight of 69 kilograms.

== Medalists ==
Gold	Daniyar Yeleussinov (KAZ)
Silver	Arisnoidys Despaigne (CUB)
Bronze	Arajik Marutjan (GER)
Bronze	Gabriel Maestre (VEN)

== Seeds ==
1. (Wales) Fred Evans (quarterfinals)
2. (Mexico) Marvin Cabrera (third round)
3. (Venezuela) Gabriel Maestre (semifinals)
4. (Kazakhstan) Daniyar Yeleussinov (champion)
5. (Italy) Vincenzo Mangiacapre (quarterfinals)
6. (Russia) Alexander Besputin (quarterfinals)
7. (Canada) Custio Clayton (third round)
8. (Brazil) Roberto de Queiroz (second round)
9. (Germany) Arajik Marutjan (semifinals)
10. (Algeria) Ilyas Abbadi (second round)

== Draw ==
=== Finals ===
Semifinals
1	(Germany) Arajik Marutjan	0
4	(Kazakhstan) Daniyar Yeleussinov	3
3	(Venezuela) Gabriel Maestre	0
2	(Cuba) Arisnoidys Despaigne	3

Final
(Kazakhstan) Daniyar Yeleussinov	3
(Cuba) Arisnoidys Despaigne	0

=== Top half ===
==== Section 1 ====
First Round
(Sri Lanka) Tharindu Gedara
(Georgia (country)) Zaal Kvachatadze	TKO
(Kyrgyzstan) Erkinbek Bolotbek	3
(Morocco) Mohammed Rabii	0
(Australia) Daniel Lewis	0
(Kenya) Rayton Okwiri	3
(Turkey) Önder Şipal	3
(Costa Rica) Jason Blanco	0
(Bulgaria) Simeon Chamov	3
(Denmark) Allan Mahfoud	0

Second Round
(Wales) Fred Evans	2
(Georgia (country)) Zaal Kvachatadze	1
(Kyrgyzstan) Erkinbek Bolotbek	0
(Kenya) Rayton Okwiri	3
(Germany) Arajik Marutjan	3
(Turkey) Önder Şipal	0
(Bulgaria) Simeon Chamov	3
(Brazil) Roberto de Queiroz	0

Third Round
(Wales) Fred Evans	3
(Kenya) Rayton Okwiri	0
(Germany) Arajik Marutjan	3
(Bulgaria) Simeon Chamov	0

Quarterfinals
(Wales) Fred Evans	0
(Germany) Arajik Marutjan	3

==== Section 2 ====
First Round
(Belarus) Pavel Kastramin
(Ukraine) Denys Lazarev	TKO
(Chinese Taipei) Wang Yu-jen
(Azerbaijan) Parviz Baghirov	TKO
(United States) Jamontay Clark	0
(Moldova) Vasile Belous	3
(Republic of Ireland) Adam Nolan	1
(France) Souleymane Cissokho	2
(Japan) Yasuhiro Suzuki	3
(Afghanistan) Allah Rahemi	0
(The Bahamas) Carl Hield	3
(Scotland) Lewis Benson	0

Second Round
(Italy) Vincenzo Mangiacapre	2
(Ukraine) Denys Lazarev	1
(Azerbaijan) Parviz Baghirov	3
(Moldova) Vasile Belous	0
(France) Souleymane Cissokho	3
(Japan) Yasuhiro Suzuki	0
(The Bahamas) Carl Hield	0
(Kazakhstan) Daniyar Yeleussinov	3

Third Round
(Italy) Vincenzo Mangiacapre	3
(Azerbaijan) Parviz Baghirov	0
(France) Souleymane Cissokho	0
(Kazakhstan) Daniyar Yeleussinov	3

Quarterfinals
(Italy) Vincenzo Mangiacapre	0
(Kazakhstan) Daniyar Yeleussinov	3

=== Bottom half ===
==== Section 3 ====
First Round
(Hungary) Imre Bácskai	3
(Thailand) Apichet Saensit	0
(Zambia) Mbachi Kaonga	KO
(Zimbabwe) Brighton Masiyambumbi
(Croatia) Borna Katalinic	0
(Poland) Ireneusz Zakrzewski	3
(India) Mandeep Jangra	3
(Tanzania) Selemani Kidunda	0
(Turkmenistan) Serdar Hudayberdiyev	3
(Saint Lucia) Lyndel Marcellin	0
(Mongolia) Byambyn Tüvshinbat	3
(China) Maimaitituersun Qiong	0

Second Round
(Venezuela) Gabriel Maestre	2
(Hungary) Imre Bácskai	1
(Zambia) Mbachi Kaonga	0
(Poland) Ireneusz Zakrzewski	3
(India) Mandeep Jangra	0
(Turkmenistan) Serdar Hudayberdiyev	2
(Mongolia) Byambyn Tüvshinbat	1
(Russia) Alexander Besputin	2

Third Round
(Venezuela) Gabriel Maestre	3
(Poland) Ireneusz Zakrzewski	0
(Turkmenistan) Serdar Hudayberdiyev	0
(Russia) Alexander Besputin	3

Quarterfinals
(Venezuela) Gabriel Maestre	3
(Russia) Alexander Besputin	0

==== Section 4 ====
First Round
(Nauru) Joseph Deireragea	0
(Kosovo) Arian Gashi	3
(Cuba) Arisnoidys Despaigne	2
(Uzbekistan) Hurshidbek Normatov	1
(Chile) Daniel Tapia	0
(Algeria) Ilyas Abbadi	3
(Lithuania) Eimantas Stanionis	3
(Czech Republic) Robert Bilík	0
(Armenia) Aram Amirkhanyan	3
(Israel) Artem Masily	0
(Nigeria) Korede Adeniji	3
(Jamaica) Kestna Davis	0

Second Round
(Canada) Custio Clayton	3
(Kosovo) Arian Gashi	0
(Cuba) Arisnoidys Despaigne	3
(Algeria) Ilyas Abbadi	0
(Lithuania) Eimantas Stanionis	1
(Armenia) Aram Amirkhanyan	2
(Nigeria) Korede Adeniji	0
(Mexico) Marvin Cabrera	3

Third Round
(Canada) Custio Clayton	0
(Cuba) Arisnoidys Despaigne	3
(Armenia) Aram Amirkhanyan	2
(Mexico) Marvin Cabrera	1

Quarterfinals
(Cuba) Arisnoidys Despaigne	3
(Armenia) Aram Amirkhanyan	0
