= Lester Martínez =

Guatemalan boxer (born 1995)

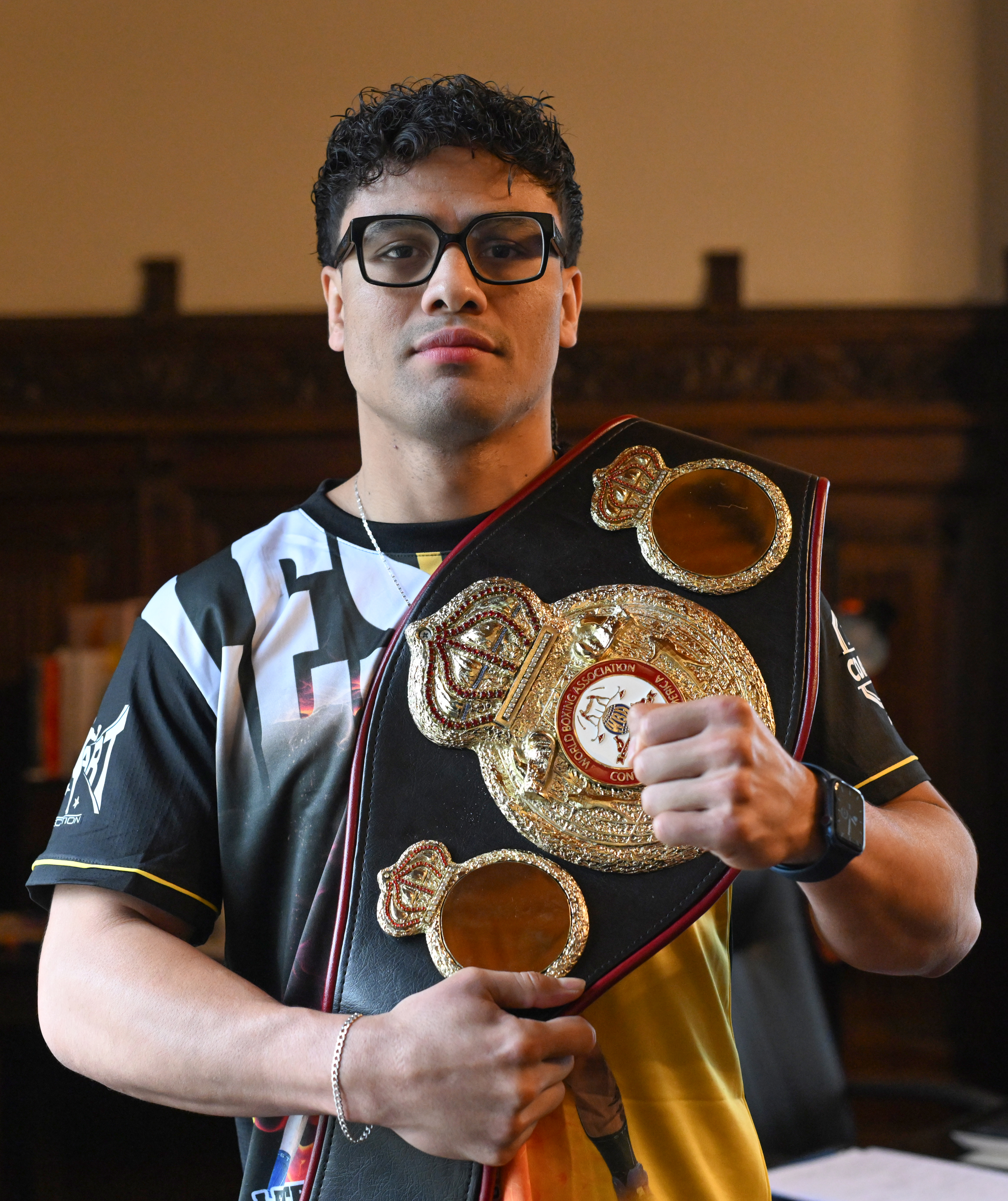
- Martínez in 2025

Personal information
- Born: Lester Normandy Martínez Tut; 17 October 1995 (age 31) Melchor de Mencos, Guatemala
- Height: 5 ft 8 in (173 cm)
- Weight: Super middleweight

Boxing career
- Reach: 71 1/2 in (182 cm)
- Stance: Orthodox

Boxing record
- Total fights: 22
- Wins: 21
- Win by KO: 17
- Draws: 1
Medal record
Men's Amateur boxing
Representing Guatemala
Central American and Caribbean Games
Gold medal – first place	2018 Barranquilla	Middleweight
Central American Games
Gold medal – first place	2013 San José	Light-welterweight
Gold medal – first place	2017 Managua	Middleweight
Central American Championships
Gold medal – first place	2011 Managua	Light-welterweight
Gold medal – first place	2012 San José	Welterweight
Youth World Championships
Silver medal – second place	2012 Yerevan	Light-welterweight

Lester Normandy Martínez Tut (born 17 October 1995) is a Guatemalan professional boxer. He has held the WBC interim super-middleweight title since March 2026. As an amateur, Martínez won a light-welterweight silver medal at the 2012 Youth World Championships and a middleweight gold medal at the 2018 Central American and Caribbean Games.

== Early years ==
Martínez was born on 17 October 1995 in the municipality of Melchor de Mencos in Petén Department, but grew up in San Benito. He began boxing at the age of twelve and won the schoolboy national championship in 2009. He soon moved to the capital, Guatemala City, to continue his development. He won his first international competition in 2011, earning a gold medal at that year's Central American Championships in Managua. The following year, he repeated as Central American champion and won gold at the Panamerican School Games before taking home a silver at the Youth World Championships in Yerevan, becoming the first Guatemalan to ever medal at an AIBA world championship. He also lost to Jamel Herring in the 2012 American Boxing Olympic Qualification Tournament. After achieving back-to-back first-place finishes at the Central American Games in 2013 and 2017, he became the first Guatemalan boxer in 68 years to win gold at the Central American and Caribbean Games when he beat former World and Olympic champion Arlen López for the middleweight crown in 2018.

=== Amateur results ===
- 2009 National Schoolboys Championships in Guatemala (bantamweight)
  - Defeated Cristian Estrada PTS
  - Defeated Dani Lopez PTS (gold)
- 2011 Panamerican Junior Championships in Tena, Ecuador (light-welterweight)
  - Lost to Miguel Ferrín (Ecuador)
- 2011 Central American Championships in Managua, Nicaragua (light-welterweight)
  - Defeated Alfredo de Jesus Martinez (El Salvador) 19–11
  - Defeated Álvaro Mercado (Nicaragua) 23–15 (gold)
- 2012 American Olympic Qualification Tournament in Rio de Janeiro, Brazil (light-welterweight)
  - Defeated Kendall Ebanks (Cayman Islands) WO
  - Lost to Jamel Herring (United States) 9–15
- 2012 Panamerican School Games in Guatemala City, Guatemala (light-welterweight)
  - Defeated Carlos Rosas (Venezuela) RSC1 (gold)
- 2012 Central American Championships in San José, Costa Rica (welterweight)
  - Defeated David Lobo (Costa Rica) 28–10
  - Defeated Roberto Arriaza (Nicaragua) 11–1 (gold)
- 2012 Youth World Championships in Yerevan, Armenia (light-welterweight)
  - Defeated Naim Azizov (Tajikistan) 23–11
  - Defeated Ricky Rowlands (Wales) 19–14
  - Defeated Izatulla Shermakhamadov (Kyrgyzstan) 22–16
  - Defeated Carlos Adames (Dominican Republic) 22–15
  - Defeated Parviz Baghirov (Azerbaijan) 13–9
  - Lost to Kevin Hayler Brown (Cuba) 14–17 (silver)
- 2013 Central American Games in San José, Costa Rica (light-welterweight)
  - Defeated Daniel Álvarez (Honduras) 21–7
  - Defeated Omer Rodríguez (Panama) 26–9
  - Defeated Julio Laguna (Nicaragua) 14–9 (gold)
- 2013 Jose Cheo Aponte Tournament in Caguas, Puerto Rico (light-welterweight)
  - Elite bracket
    - Lost to Damian Giro (Puerto Rico) WO
  - Youth bracket
    - Defeated Ángel López (Puerto Rico) PTS
    - Lost to Jonathan Santos (Brazil) PTS (silver)
- 2014 Central American and Caribbean Games qualification in Tijuana, Mexico (welterweight)
  - Defeated Alberto Puello (Dominican Republic) 2–1
  - Defeated Carl Hield (The Bahamas) 3–0
  - Lost to Roniel Iglesias (Cuba) 0–3 (silver)
- 2014 Pacific Cup in Guayaquil, Ecuador (welterweight)
  - Defeated Abel Mina (Ecuador) 2–1
  - Defeated Manuel Guzmán (Costa Rica) 3–0
  - Lost to Alberto Puello (Dominican Republic) 1–2 (silver)
- 2014 Central American and Caribbean Games in Veracruz, Mexico (welterweight)
  - Lost to Carl Hield (The Bahamas) 0–3
- 2015 Jose Cheo Aponte Tournament in Caguas, Puerto Rico (welterweight)
  - Defeated Jose Peguero (U.S. Virgin Islands) 3–0
  - Defeated Jose Roman (Puerto Rico) 3–0
  - Lost to Joelvis Hernández (Venezuela) 1–2 (bronze)
- 2015 Pan American Games qualification in Tijuana, Mexico (welterweight)
  - Lost to Juan Ramón Solano (Dominican Republic) 0–2
- 2015 Panamerican Championships in Vargas, Venezuela (welterweight)
  - Defeated Daniel Munoz (Chile) 3–0
  - Lost to Roniel Iglesias (Cuba) 0–3
- 2015 National Championships in Guatemala City, Guatemala (welterweight)
  - Defeated Luis Barillas (gold)
- 2015 World Championships in Doha, Qatar (welterweight)
  - Lost to Marvin Cabrera (Mexico) 0–3
- 2016 American Olympic Qualification Tournament in Buenos Aires, Argentina (welterweight)
  - Defeated Yogly Vargas (Colombia) 3–0
  - Defeated Jose Roman (Puerto Rico) 3–0
  - Lost to Gabriel Maestre (Venezuela) 1–2
  - Lost to Alberto Palmetta (Argentina) 0–3
- 2016 Giraldo Cordova Cardin Tournament in Havana, Cuba (welterweight)
  - Defeated Liu Wei (China) 2–1
  - Defeated Arisnoidys Despaigne (Cuba) 2–1
  - Lost to Antonio Bicet (Cuba) 1–2 (bronze)
- 2016 World Olympic Qualifying Tournament in Baku, Azerbaijan (welterweight)
  - Lost to Paul Kroll (United States) 0–3
- 2016 Maiduvin Trujillo Cup in Antigua, Guatemala (middleweight)
  - Defeated Isamary Lima (Guatemala) 3–0
  - Defeated Jaime Lemus (El Salvador) 3–0 (gold)
- 2017 Panamerican Championships in Tegucigalpa, Honduras (middleweight)
  - Defeated Joseph Cherkashyn (Chile) 3–0
  - Defeated Hebert Conceição (Brazil) 4–1
  - Lost to Arlen López (Cuba) 2–3 (bronze)
- 2017 World Championships in Hamburg, Germany (middleweight)
  - Lost to Max van der Pas (Netherlands) 2–3
- 2017 National Championships in Guatemala City, Guatemala (middleweight)
  - Defeated Misael Cruz Barahona
  - Defeated Luis Arturo García (gold)
- 2017 Central American Games in Managua, Nicaragua (middleweight)
  - Defeated Jairo Luna (El Salvador) 5–0
  - Defeated Lester Espino (Nicaragua) 5–0 (gold)
- 2018 Central American and Caribbean Games qualification in Tijuana, Mexico (middleweight)
  - Lost to Arlen López (Cuba) 1–4
- 2018 Central American and Caribbean Games in Barranquilla, Colombia (middleweight)
  - Defeated Luis Hernández (Panama) 5–0
  - Defeated Luis Rodríguez (Puerto Rico) 5–0
  - Defeated Arlen López (Cuba) 3–2 (gold)

== Professional career ==
In January 2019 Martínez announced his decision to go pro by signing a deal with Latin ARMS Promotions and former referee Richard Steele as his manager. He trained with Ignacio Beristáin in Mexico, and his first opponent was announced to be 46-year-old Nicaraguan former world champion Ricardo Mayorga, who stated in an interview that he would retire if he lost to the 23-year-old. On 6 April 2019 he defeated Mayorga by technical knockout (TKO) in the main event of a card in Guatemala City, backing the ex-champion into the ropes with power shots until the referee waved it off in the final second of the second round.

Two months later faced Daniel Montejo in Tijuana, Mexico, scoring three knockdowns en route to a first-round knockout (KO) victory. After a quick 4–0 start, he went through a long period of inactivity due to the COVID-19 pandemic. He made his return on 27 August 2020, stopping Mexican rival Abraham Hernández in the second round of their Roy Jones Jr.-promoted fight in Guaymas, Mexico.

Martínez defeated Carlos Góngora by unanimous decision over 10 rounds at the Entertainment and Sports Arena in Washington, D.C., USA, on 28 June 2024.

He fought Joeshon James at the National Orange Show Event Center in San Bernardino, California, USA, on 22 March 2025, winning via technical knockout in the fourth round.

On 13 September 2025 at Allegiant Stadium in Paradise, Nevada, USA, Martínez challenged WBC interim super-middleweight champion Christian M'billi. The fight ended in a split decision draw.

He got a second chance at the now vacant title when he took on Immanuwel Aleem at the National Orange Show Event Center in San Bernardino, California, USA, on 21 March 2026. Martínez won by unanimous decision.

Martínez made a successful first defense of the title with a 10th round technical knockout win over Luka Plantić at the USC Galen Center in Los Angeles, California, USA on 29 August 2026.

== Professional boxing record ==
22 fights	21 wins	0 losses
By knockout	17	0
By decision	4	0
Draws	1	

No.	Result	Record	Opponent	Type	Round, time	Date	Location	Notes
22	Win	21–0–1	Luka Plantić	TKO	10 (12), 2:23	29 Aug 2026	USC Galen Center, Los Angeles, California, U.S.	Retained WBC interim super-middleweight title
21	Win	20–0–1	Immanuwel Aleem	UD	12	21 Mar 2026	National Orange Show Event Center, San Bernardino, California, U.S.	Won vacant WBC interim super-middleweight title
20	Draw	19–0–1	Christian M'billi	SD	10	13 Sep 2025	Allegiant Stadium, Paradise, Nevada, U.S.	For WBC interim super-middleweight title
19	Win	19–0	Joeshon James	TKO	4 (10), 1:51	22 Mar 2025	National Orange Show Event Center, San Bernardino, California, U.S.	
18	Win	18–0	Carlos Góngora	UD	10	28 Jun 2024	Entertainment and Sports Arena, Washington, D.C., U.S.	
17	Win	17–0	Rubén Angulo	KO	2 (10), 2:59	23 Feb 2024	Parque de la Industria, Guatemala City, Guatemala	Won vacant WBC Latino super middleweight title
16	Win	16–0	Lucas de Abreu	KO	4 (10), 0:33	12 Jul 2023	Whitesands Events Center, Plant City, Florida, U.S.	
15	Win	15–0	Isaiah Steen	TKO	8 (10), 1:18	10 Apr 2023	Westgate Las Vegas, Winchester, Nevada, U.S.	
14	Win	14–0	Fabián Ríos	TKO	3 (8), 0:55	11 Nov 2022	Acapulco, Mexico	
13	Win	13–0	Jeremie Parks	TKO	2 (8), 0:31	8 Oct 2022	Mississippi Basketball and Athletics, Jackson, Mississippi, U.S.	
12	Win	12–0	Rodolfo Gomez Jr.	UD	10	30 Jul 2022	Sames Auto Arena, Laredo, Texas, U.S.	
11	Win	11–0	Jaime Hernández	RTD	4 (8), 3:00	24 Mar 2022	Palenque de la Feria, Tepic, Mexico	
10	Win	10–0	Raiko Santana	UD	10	14 Oct 2021	Auditorio Benito Juarez, Los Mochis, Mexico	Retained WBO Latino super-middleweight title
9	Win	9–0	Gabriel López	KO	4 (10), 2:43	3 Apr 2021	Polideportivo Centenario, Los Mochis, Mexico	Won vacant WBO Latino super-middleweight title
8	Win	8–0	Juan Torres	KO	1 (10), 2:58	26 Feb 2021	Hotel Canopy Hilton, Cancún, Mexico	
7	Win	7–0	Uriel González	KO	1 (8), 2:50	9 Dec 2020	Marinaterra Hotel Spa, Guaymas, Mexico	Won vacant WBC Latino super-middleweight title
6	Win	6–0	Michi Munoz	KO	1 (8), 1:59	22 Oct 2020	Marinaterra Hotel Spa, Guaymas, Mexico	
5	Win	5–0	Abraham Hernández	TKO	2 (6), 1:37	27 Aug 2020	Marinaterra Hotel Spa, Guaymas, Mexico	
4	Win	4–0	Roy Fernández	TKO	3 (4), 1:27	27 Jul 2019	Futeca Majadas, Guatemala City, Guatemala	
3	Win	3–0	Jesús Levis Jiménez	TKO	2 (4), 0:43	28 Jun 2019	Big Punch Arena, Tijuana, Mexico	
2	Win	2–0	Daniel Montejo	KO	1 (4), 2:37	14 Jun 2019	Big Punch Arena, Tijuana, Mexico	
1	Win	1–0	Ricardo Mayorga	TKO	2 (6), 2:59	6 Apr 2019	Cancha de Futeca, Cayala, Guatemala City, Guatemala	

== See also ==
- List of male boxers
- List of Guatemalans

Sporting positions
Regional boxing titles
Vacant Title last held by Roamer Alexis Angulo	WBC Latino super-middleweight champion 9 December 2020 – 2021; Vacated	Vacant Title next held by Yamaguchi Falcão
Vacant Title last held by Roamer Alexis Angulo	WBO Latino super-middleweight champion 3 April 2021 – 2023; Vacated	Vacant Title next held by Ernesbadi Begue Brooks
Vacant Title last held by Yamaguchi Falcão	WBC Latino super-middleweight champion 23 February 2024 – 2025; Vacated	Vacant Title next held by Wyatt Trujillo
New title	WBA Continental Latin America super-middleweight champion 27 June 2024 – 2025; Vacated	Vacant
World boxing titles
Vacant Title last held by Christian M'billi	WBC super-middleweight champion Interim title 21 March 2026 – pressnt	Incumbent
