= Daniyar Yeleussinov =

Kazakhstani boxer (born 1991)

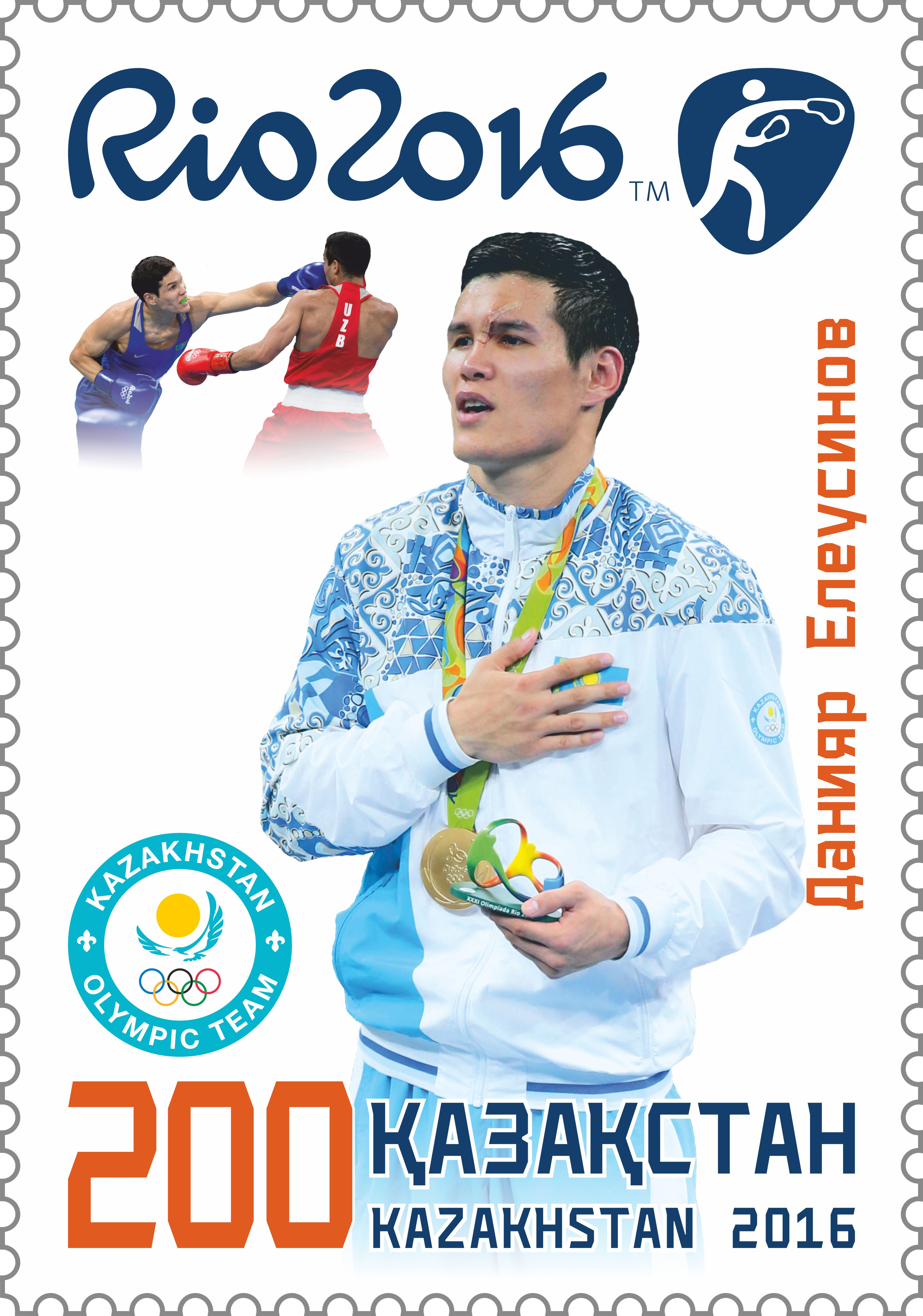
- Yeleussinov on a 2016 stamp of Kazakhstan

Personal information
- Nickname: Kazakh Thunder
- Nationality: Kazakhstani
- Born: Данияр Маратұлы Елеусінов; 13 March 1991 (age 35) Berezino, West Kazakhstan Region, Kazakh SSR, Soviet Union
- Height: 1.79 m (5 ft 10 in)
- Weight: Welterweight

Boxing career
- Stance: Southpaw

Boxing record
- Total fights: 12
- Wins: 12
- Win by KO: 7
Medal record
Representing Kazakhstan
Olympic Games
Gold medal – first place	2016 Rio de Janeiro	-69 kg
World Championships
Gold medal – first place	2013 Almaty	-69 kg
Silver medal – second place	2015 Doha	-69 kg
Asian Games
Gold medal – first place	2010 Guangzhou	-64 kg
Gold medal – first place	2014 Incheon	-69 kg
Asian Championships
Gold medal – first place	2013 Amman	-69 kg
Gold medal – first place	2015 Bangkok	-69 kg
AIBA Youth World Boxing Championships
Silver medal – second place	2008 Guadalajara	Lightweight

Daniyar Maratovich Yeleussinov (born 13 March 1991) is a Kazakh professional boxer who was the IBO welterweight champion in 2021. As an amateur he competed at the 2012 and 2016 Olympics, winning a gold medal in 2016. He also won gold medals at the 2010 and 2014 Asian Games; the 2013 World Championships; and silver at the 2015 World Championships.

== Amateur career ==
Yeleussinov began boxing in 1999 and is trained by his father Marat Yeleussinov. Yeleussinov kickstarted his career with gold in the 2010 Asian Games, and in 2013, won in both the AIBA World Championships and the Asian Championships. He has been named twice the AIBA Elite Men’s Boxer of the Year.

Going into the 2016 Olympics, won all of his bouts via 3-0 decisions including a win over top British fighter, Josh Kelly in the 2nd round.

His style has been compared to Vasyl Lomachenko and Floyd Mayweather Jr. Yeleussinov is the 4th straight Kazakhstan boxer to win gold in the welterweight division.

== World Amateur Championships results ==
2011 (as a light welterweight)

- Defeated Josh Taylor (Scotland) 11–15
- Defeated Masatsugu Kawachi (Japan) 14–4
- Lost to Gyula Káté (Hungary) 11–17

2013 (as a welterweight)

- Defeated Carl Hield (Bahamas) 3–0
- Defeated Souleymane Cissokho (France) 3–0
- Defeated Vincenzo Mangiacapre (Italy) 3–0
- Defeated Arajik Marutjan (Germany) 3–0
- Defeated Arisnoidys Despaigne (Cuba) 3–0

2015 (as a welterweight)

- Defeated Pavel Kastramin (Belarus) 3–0
- Defeated Eumir Marcial (Philippines) 3–0
- Defeated Parviz Baghirov (Azerbaijan) 3–0
- Lost to Mohammed Rabii (Morocco) 3–0

== Olympic Games results ==
2012 (as a light welterweight)

- Defeated Jamel Herring (USA) 19–9
- Defeated Mehdi Tolouti (Iran) 19–10
- Lost to Vincenzo Mangiacapre (Italy) 12–16

2016 (as a welterweight)

- Defeated Josh Kelly (Great Britain) 3–0
- Defeated Gabriel Maestre (Venezuela) 3–0
- Defeated Souleymane Cissokho (France) 3–0
- Defeated Shakhram Giyasov (Uzbekistan) 3–0

== Professional career ==
In March 2018, Yeleussinov signed a professional contract with Eddie Hearn’s Matchroom Sport and became the first Kazakh to join the stable. He made his professional debut on 28 April 2018, scoring a third-round technical knockout (TKO) over Noah Kidd at the Barclays Center in New York.

== Professional boxing record ==
13 fights	13 wins	0 losses
By knockout	8	0
By decision	5	0

No.	Result	Record	Opponent	Type	Round, time	Date	Location	Notes
13	Win	13–0	James Bacon	TKO	2 (8), 2:32	19 Jul 2025	Meadows Racetrack & Casino, Washington, Pennsylvania, U.S.	
12	Win	12–0	Joe Noynay	RTD	5 (10), 3:00	28 Sep 2024	Almaty Arena, Almaty, Kazakhstan	
11	Win	11–0	Juan Hernan Leal	UD	12	18 Dec 2021	Astana, Kazakhstan	Won vacant IBO welterweight title
10	Win	10–0	Julius Indongo	TKO	2 (10), 0:30	27 Nov 2020	Seminole Hard Rock Hotel & Casino, Hollywood, Florida, U.S.	Won vacant IBF Inter-Continental welterweight title
9	Win	9–0	Alan Sanchez	TKO	5 (10), 0:15	20 Dec 2019	Talking Stick Resort Arena, Phoenix, Arizona, U.S.	
8	Win	8–0	Reshard Hicks	TKO	1 (10), 2:38	13 Sep 2019	Madison Square Garden Theater, New York City, New York, U.S.	
7	Win	7–0	Luis Norambuena	UD	6	25 May 2019	MGM National Harbor, Oxon Hill, Maryland, U.S.	
6	Win	6–0	Silverio Ortiz	UD	8	15 Mar 2019	Liacouras Center, Philadelphia, Pennsylvania, U.S.	
5	Win	5–0	Marcos Mojica	TKO	3 (8), 1:10	24 Nov 2018	Casino de Salle Medecin, Monte Carlo, Monaco	
4	Win	4–0	Matt Doherty	TKO	1 (6), 2:33	20 Oct 2018	TD Garden, Boston, Massachusetts, U.S.	
3	Win	3–0	Gabor Gorbics	PTS	6	4 Aug 2018	Ice Arena Wales, Cardiff, Wales	
2	Win	2–0	Zoltan Szabo	PTS	6	6 Jun 2018	York Hall, London, England	
1	Win	1–0	Noah Kidd	TKO	3 (6), 2:52	28 Apr 2018	Barclays Center, New York City, New York, U.S.	
