= Steven Donnelly =

Irish boxer (born 1988)

Personal information
- Nationality: (Republic of Ireland) Irish
- Born: Steven Gerard Donnelly; 7 September 1988 (age 37) Ballymena, Northern Ireland
- Height: 1.82 m (6 ft 0 in)
- Weight: Light-Middleweight

Boxing career
- Stance: Orthodox
Medal record
Men's amateur boxing
Representing Northern Ireland
Commonwealth Games
Bronze medal – third place	2014 Glasgow	Welterweight
Bronze medal – third place	2018 Gold Coast	Middleweight

Steven Gerard Donnelly (born 7 September 1988) is an Irish professional boxer from Northern Ireland who represented Ireland at the 2016 Summer Olympics in Rio de Janeiro, Brazil as an amateur.

== Boxing career ==
Donnelly represented Northern Ireland at the 2010 Commonwealth Games held in New Delhi, India. Competing in the light welterweight division he faced Australian Luke Woods in the first round and was eliminated from the competition after a 0–10 loss. Following his defeat Donnelly was subsequently sent home from the Games by team management after drinking alcohol and causing a disturbance in the athlete's village. After this he became disillusioned with the sport and quit boxing for two years before eventually returning to the All Saints Boxing Club in Ballymena.

At the 2014 Commonwealth Games held in Glasgow, Scotland, Donnelly was again selected for the Northern Ireland team. Competing in the welterweight division he defeated Hasan Asif of Pakistan in the round of 32, Oscar Finau of Tonga in the round of 16 and Canadian Custio Clayton in the quarterfinals. In his semifinal Donnelly was beaten on a split judge's decision by India’s Mandeep Jangra, meaning he finished with a bronze medal.

Donnelly took part in the 2015 World Series of Boxing, representing the Polish Hussars team. He won five of his six fights, beating Kazakhstan's Madiyar Ashkeyev, Brian Ceballo of the United States, Puerto Rican Nicklaus Flaz Guillen, Alberto Palmetta of Argentina and Italy's Dario Morello, but was defeated by Venezuelan Gabriel Maestre and suffered a walkover defeat after visa issues meant he was unable to travel to fight Azerbaijan's Parviz Baghirov.

Donnelly qualified to represent Ireland in the men's welterweight event at the 2016 Summer Olympics to be held in Rio de Janeiro, Brazil, via his fourth-place ranking in the World Series of Boxing. Only the top two ranked athletes were due to qualify through the rankings but two of the athletes ranked ahead of him qualified by alternate methods, Morocco’s Mohammad Rabii secured his place through the 2015 AIBA World Boxing Championships and Andrey Zamkovoy won the Russian championships to confirm his place.

== Professional boxing record ==
Win	9-0	(Czech Republic) Pavel Albrecht	TKO	3 (6)	2020-03-07	(United Kingdom) Brentwood Centre, Brentwood, England	
Win	8-0	(United Kingdom) Lenny Fuller	TKO	2 (3)	2019-09-20	(United Kingdom) Indigo at the O2, Greenwich, England	Ultimate Boxxer Final
Win	7-0	(United Kingdom) Sean Robinson	UD	3	2019-09-20	(United Kingdom) Indigo at the O2, Greenwich, England	Ultimate Boxxer Semi-finals
Win	6-0	(United Kingdom) Ish O'Connor	TKO	1 (3)	2019-09-20	(United Kingdom) Indigo at the O2, Greenwich, England	Ultimate Boxxer Quarterfinals
Win	5-0	(Nicaragua) Edwin Palacios	KO	4 (6)	2019-05-17	(United Kingdom) Ulster Hall, Belfast, Northern Ireland	Left hook to the body
Win	4–0	(United States) Ray Cervera	UD	4	2018-10-27	Madison Square Garden, New York, United States	
Win	3–0	(Lithuania) Aryvdas Trizno	PTS	4	2018-10-05	(United Kingdom) Titanic Exhibition Centre, Belfast, Northern Ireland	
Win	2–0	(Nicaragua) Miguel Aguilar	PTS	4	2018-09-08	(United Kingdom) Arena Birmingham, Birmingham, England	
Win	1–0	(United Kingdom) Kevin McCauley	PTS	4	2018-08-18	(United Kingdom) Windsor Park, Belfast, Northern Ireland	Professional debut.

== Personal life ==
Donnelly was born in Ballymena, Northern Ireland.
