= 2015 AIBA World Boxing Championships – Welterweight =

Boxing competitions

The welterweight competition at the 2015 AIBA World Boxing Championships will be held from 7–15 October 2015. This is a qualifying tournament for the upcoming 2016 Summer Olympics. Mohammed Rabii of Morocco defeated Daniyar Yeleussinov of Kazakhstan to win the world title.

== Medalists ==
Gold	Mohammed Rabii (MAR)
Silver	Daniyar Yeleussinov (KAZ)
Bronze	Parviz Baghirov (AZE)
Bronze	Liu Wei (CHN)

== Seeds ==
1. (Kazakhstan) Daniyar Yeleussinov
2. (Morocco) Mohammed Rabii
3. (Venezuela) Gabriel Maestre (round of 16)
4. (Azerbaijan) Parviz Baghirov (semifinals)

== Draw ==
=== Finals ===
Semifinals
1	Daniyar Yeleussinov (KAZ)	3
4	Parviz Baghirov (AZE)	0
3	Liu Wei (CHN)	0
2	Mohammed Rabii (MAR)	3

Final
Daniyar Yeleussinov (KAZ)	0
Mohammed Rabii (MAR)	3

==== Section 1 ====
Round of 32
Pavel Kastramin (BLR)	2
Yasuhiro Suzuki (JPN)	1
Said Mohamed Walid (EGY)
Eumir Marcial (PHI)	TKO
Saylom Ardee (THA)	1
Youba Sissokho Ndiaye (ESP)	2
Clarence Goyeram (SWE)	0
Yaroslav Samofalov (UKR)	3
Marvin Cabrera Vergara (MEX)	3
Lester Martínez (GUA)	0

Round of 16
Daniyar Yeleussinov (KAZ)	3
Pavel Kastramin (BLR)	0
Eumir Marcial (PHI)	2
Youba Sissokho Ndiaye (ESP)	1
Roniel Iglesias (CUB)	3
Yaroslav Samofalov (UKR)	0
Marvin Cabrera Vergara (MEX)	0
Parviz Baghirov (AZE)	3

Quarterfinals
Daniyar Yeleussinov (KAZ)	3
Eumir Marcial (PHI)	0
Roniel Iglesias (CUB)	1
Parviz Baghirov (AZE)	2

Semifinals
Daniyar Yeleussinov (KAZ)	3
Parviz Baghirov (AZE)	0

=== Section 2 ===
Round of 32
Eimantas Stanionis (LTU)	2
Adam Nolan (IRL)	1
Byambyn Tüvshinbat (MGL)	3
Zdeněk Chládek (CZE)	0
Josh Kelly (GBR)	3
Nathan Webber (AUS)	0
Hzam Nabah (QAT)	0
Alberto Palmetta (ARG)	3

Round of 16
Gabriel Maestre (VEN)	0
Eimantas Stanionis (LTU)	3
Byambyn Tüvshinbat (MGL)	0
Liu Wei (CHN)	3
Josh Nyika (NZL)	0
Josh Kelly (GBR)	3
Alberto Palmetta (ARG)	0
Mohammed Rabii (MAR)	3

Quarterfinals
Eimantas Stanionis (LTU)	1
Liu Wei (CHN)	2
Josh Kelly (GBR)	0
Mohammed Rabii (MAR)	3

Semifinals
Liu Wei (CHN)	0
Mohammed Rabii (MAR)	3

== Results ==
=== Ranking ===
Rank	Athlete
1st place, gold medalist(s)	Mohammed Rabii (MAR)
2nd place, silver medalist(s)	Daniyar Yeleussinov (KAZ)
3rd place, bronze medalist(s)	Parviz Baghirov (AZE)
3rd place, bronze medalist(s)	Liu Wei (CHN)
5	Eumir Marcial (PHI)
5	Roniel Iglesias (CUB)
5	Eimantas Stanionis (LTU)
5	Josh Kelly (GBR)
9	Pavel Kastramin (BLR)
9	Youba Sissokho Ndiaye (ESP)
9	Yaroslav Samofalov (UKR)
9	Marvin Cabrera Vergara (MEX)
9	Gabriel Maestre (VEN)
9	Byambyn Tüvshinbat (MGL)
9	Josh Nyika (NZL)
9	Alberto Palmetta (ARG)
17	Yasuhiro Suzuki (JPN)
17	Said Mohamed Walid (EGY)
17	Saylom Ardee (THA)
17	Clarence Goyeram (SWE)
17	Lester Martínez (GUA)
17	Adam Nolan (IRL)
17	Zdeněk Chládek (CZE)
17	Nathan Webber (AUS)
17	Hzam Nabah (QAT)
