= Boxing at the 2014 Commonwealth Games – Welterweight =

Boxing competitions

Boxing – Welterweight at the 2014 Commonwealth Games
- Venue: Scottish Exhibition and Conference Centre
- Dates: 25 July – 2 August 2014
- Competitors: 31 from 31 nations

Medalists
gold medal	Scott Fitzgerald	England
silver medal	Mandeep Jangra	India
bronze medal	Tulani Mbenge	South Africa
bronze medal	Steven Donnelly	Northern Ireland

The Welterweight boxing competition at the 2014 Commonwealth Games in Glasgow, Scotland took place between 25 July and 2 August at the Scottish Exhibition and Conference Centre.

Like all Commonwealth boxing events, the competition was a straight single-elimination tournament. Both semifinal losers were awarded bronze medals, so no boxers competed again after their first loss. Bouts consisted of three rounds of three minutes each, with one-minute breaks between rounds. Punches scored only if the front of the glove made full contact with the front of the head or torso of the opponent. Tree scored each bout; The winner of the bout was the boxer who won the most rounds.

== Schedule ==
All times are British Summer Time (UTC+1)

Date	Time	Round
Friday 25 July 2014	13:00 & 18:45	Round of 32
Monday 28 July 2014	13:40 & 19:10	Round of 16
Wednesday 30 July 2014	18:50	Quarter-finals
Friday 1 August 2014	18:50	Semi-finals
Saturday 2 August 2014	19:00	Final

== Medalists ==
Gold	Scott Fitzgerald; England
Silver	Mandeep Jangra; India
Bronze	Tulani Mbenge; South Africa
Bronze	Steven Donnelly; Northern Ireland

== Results ==
Round of 32
Andrew Aisaga (PNG)	0
Maduranga Pathirage Don (SRI)	3
Tulani Mbenge (RSA)	3
Henry Tyrell (SAM)	0
Merven Clair (MRI)	0
Rayton Okwiri (KEN)	3
Azumah Mohammed (GHA)	3
Joseph Deireragea (NRU)	0
Scott Fitzgerald (ENG)	KO3
Ron Bastien (LCA)
Bowyn Morgan (NZL)	2
Lewis Benson (SCO)	1
Mmusi Tswiige (BOT)	3
Kokole Paneng (LES)	0
Kehinde Ademuyiwa (NGR)	3
Seleman Kidunda (TAN)	0
Daniel Lewis (AUS)	KO1
Mohamed Sillah (SLE)	0
Kestna Davis (JAM)	3
Mohammad Hossain (BAN)	0
Augusto Mathule (MOZ)	0
Mandeep Jangra (IND)	3
Carl Heild (BAH)	KO1
Mbachi Kaonga (ZAM)	0
Jonathan Francois (GRN)	0
Custio Clayton (CAN)	3
Hasan Asif (PAK)	0
Steven Donnelly (NIR)	KO1
Damian Davidson (ANT)	0
Oscar Finau (TON)	3

Round of 16
Eon Bancroft (GUY)	2
Maduranga Pathirage Don (SRI)	1
Tulani Mbenge (RSA)	2
Rayton Okwiri (KEN)	1
Azumah Mohammed (GHA)	1
Scott Fitzgerald (ENG)	2
Bowyn Morgan (NZL)	2
Mmusi Tswiige (BOT)	1
Kehinde Ademuyiwa (NGR)	0
Daniel Lewis (AUS)	3
Kestna Davis (JAM)	0
Mandeep Jangra (IND)	3
Carl Heild (BAH)	0
Custio Clayton (CAN)	3
Steven Donnelly (NIR)	3
Oscar Finau (TON)	0

Quarterfinals
Eon Bancroft (GUY)	0
Tulani Mbenge (RSA)	3
Scott Fitzgerald (ENG)	2
Bowyn Morgan (NZL)	1
Daniel Lewis (AUS)	0
Mandeep Jangra (IND)	3
Custio Clayton (CAN)	1
Steven Donnelly (NIR)	2

Semifinals
Tulani Mbenge (RSA)	0
Scott Fitzgerald (ENG)	3
Mandeep Jangra (IND)	2
Steven Donnelly (NIR)	1

Final
Scott Fitzgerald (ENG)	KO3
Mandeep Jangra (IND)	0
