= Bowyn Morgan =

New Zealand boxer (born 1989)

Personal information
- Nickname: BoMan
- Born: 13 January 1989 (age 37) Waihi, New Zealand
- Height: 1.77 m (5 ft 10 in)
- Weight: Welterweight; Light-middleweight

Boxing career
- Reach: 169 cm (67 in)
- Stance: Orthodox

Boxing record
- Total fights: 24
- Wins: 22
- Win by KO: 11
- Losses: 2
- No contests: 1

Bowyn Morgan (born 13 January 1989 in Waihi) is a New Zealand professional boxer. As an amateur he competed in the men's welterweight division at the 2014 Commonwealth Games in Glasgow where he would reach the quarter-finals before losing to the eventual gold medallist Scott Fitzgerald.

== Boxing career ==
=== Amateur ===
Morgan would compete in 106 amateur bouts where he would win four straight New Zealand Golden Gloves tournaments in the welterweight (67 kg) division. In 2014, he would compete at the Commonwealth Games in Glasgow, Scotland where he would go onto defeat Lewis Benson of Scotland and Mmusi Tswiige of Botswana before losing to Scott Fitzgerald of England by split-decision (2–1) in the quarter-finals.

=== Professional ===
==== Professional Debut, Signed with Duco 2014 – 2016 ====
In December 2014, Morgan made his professional boxing debut against Martin Mech. The Martin Mech who is originally from Czech Republic, has fought Morgan before in their amateur careers. Morgan won the fight by third-round TKO. In his second professional fight, Morgan fought on his first televised show on a Joseph Parker undercard. Morgan took on Ivana Siau in March 2015, winning by Unanimous Decision. Dean Lonergan of Duco Events signed Morgan for a three-fight deal contract as their promoters.

Morgan made his next televised appearance when he took on Australian Luke Travers who choose not to weigh in on weigh in day. Morgan won the fight by TKO with Travers being dropped twice before the corner threw in the towel. Early August 2015, Morgan fought against Nuka Gemmell which resulted in a no contest. The bout itself was scheduled for six rounds however it only lasted three, due to a cut to Gemmell that was caused by an accidental headbutt. Originally the bout was announced as a Technical Knockout win for Morgan, However the decision was change to a draw on the night. Late August 2015, Morgan's team made a request to the commissioning body of the night (NZPBA) to change it to reverse the result to a no contest. The NZPBA accepted the request and change the result to a no contest.

In March 2016, Morgan took on journeyman Daniel Maxwell for the NZNBF version of the vacant New Zealand National Welterweight title. The event took place in an outdoor venue at the Addington Raceway with Reece Papuni and Nort Beauchamp also fighting on the cards. Morgan won the fight by unanimous decision, picking up his first New Zealand national title. Morgan fought in his next televised appearance when he took on Australian Ben Kite. Morgan won the fight by second-round TKO. Morgan returned quickly in the ring when he took on Australian Kris George. Morgan suffered the first loss in his professional career when Kris George won the fight by third-round TKO. Morgan returned to the ring after his loss when he took on former WBO ranked boxer, Gunnar Jackson. Morgan won the fight by Unanimous decision. This was the last time Morgan fought under a Duco Events contract. He will fight on a duco events show again in 2018.

==== Multiple New Zealand champion, Multiple Regional Champion 2017 – 2018 ====
Morgan finished his 2016 with a win over Blake Bell by unanimous decision. He began his 2017 with great success when he stopped Ikani Falekaono in the second round. In April 2017, Morgan took on Gunnar Jackson in a rematch for the vacant IBO Oceania Super Welterweight title. Morgan won the fight by unanimous decision winning his first regional boxing title. Morgan would comfortably win over Thailand Australian boxer Paitoon Jaikom a few months later by unanimous decision. Morgan will finish his 2017 with a big fight against Indonesian boxer Stevie Ongen Ferdinandus for the IBO Asia Pacific Welterweight title. Stevie Ongen Ferdinandus had a previous win over another New Zealander Cairo George by Unanimous decision. Bowyn Morgan won the fight by third round Knockout, gaining his second IBO Regional title.

In May 2018, Morgan took on his next international opponent, Mexican Boxer Andres Delfin Rodriguez for the first ever Pro Box NZ Pacific Super Weltweight title. Morgan won the fight by eighth-round knockout, capturing his fourth professional title belt. Morgan would fight next on a Shane Cameron televised show, fighting on a Junior Fa Undercard. He will fight against Shay Brock for the New Zealand National (NZPBA version) Super Welterweight title. This fight was considered the biggest fight in the Super Welterweight division in New Zealand Boxing history. Morgan won the fight by Unanimous decision, winning his fifth Professional boxing title and his second New Zealand National title. The fight was considered the best fight of the night, outshining the main event. Morgan would defend his IBO Asia Pacific Welterweight title against Australian Luke Woods. Morgan won by a controversial unanimous decision. Morgan won the fight on the judges scorecard by a wide margin, however, multiple people including Morgan himself believe that he did not won that fight. Morgan would make his television return with his first fight on a Duco Events card in two years. This will be the last time Morgan will fight on a Duco Events Card. He would take on Fijian boxer Sebastian Singh for the Pro Box New Zealand Super Welterweight title. There was Controversy surrounding the fight with Sebastian Singh two and a half kilos over weight. Morgan won the fight by third-round TKO winning his third New Zealand national title and sixth professional boxing title. Sebastian Singh openly complained about the fight, expressing his frustration that the fight was stopped too early.

==== WBU World Champion, Tim Tszyu fight, Retirement 2019 – 2021 ====
In May 2019, Morgan took on Jack Asis for the vacant WBU World Welterweight title. Morgan won the fight by third-round knockout, winning his seventh Professional boxing title. Morgan would defend his World title in October 2019 against Nelson Tinampay. Morgan won the fight by second round stoppage. Mogan was scheduled to take on Charles Bellamy for the IBF Pan Pacific welterweight title in March 2020, however, due to the covid pandemic the event and fight was cancelled. During this time, Morgan was award the 15th spot in the IBF Welterweight rankings. Morgan took on Tim Tszyu in December 2020 for the IBF Australasian and WBO Global Super Welterweight titles. Morgan was able to secure the fight but was not able to return to New Zealand until after Christmas due to New Zealands strict boarder and isolation restrictions. Morgan suffered his second loss in his professional career, losing by first-round TKO.

== Boxing titles ==
- New Zealand National Boxing Federation
  - New Zealand National welterweight title
- International Boxing Organization
  - IBO Oceania-Orient light-middleweight title
  - IBO Asia Pacific welterweight title
- New Zealand Professional Boxing Association
  - NZPBA light-middleweight title
- Pro Box NZ
  - New Zealand National light-middleweight title
  - Pacific light-middleweight title
- World Boxing Union (Germany version)
  - World welterweight title

== Professional boxing record ==
25 fights	22 wins	2 losses
By knockout	11	2
By decision	11	0
No contests	1	

No.	Result	Record	Opponent	Type	Round, time	Date	Location	Notes
25	Win	22–2 (1)	Marcus Heywood	SD	8	23 Sep 2021	Wharenui Sports Centre, Christchurch, New Zealand	
24	Loss	21–2 (1)	Tim Tszyu	TKO	1 (10), 1:47	16 Dec 2020	Bankwest Stadium, Parramatta, Australia	For IBF Australasian and WBO Global light-middleweight titles
23	Win	21–1 (1)	Nelson Tinampay	TKO	2 (12), 1:25	19 Oct 2019	Christchurch Boys High School Auditorium, Christchurch, New Zealand	Retained WBU welterweight title
22	Win	20–1 (1)	Jack Asis	KO	3 (10), 2:52	18 May 2019	Christchurch Boys High School Auditorium, Christchurch, New Zealand	Won WBU welterweight title
21	Win	19–1 (1)	Sebastian Singh	TKO	3 (8)	15 Dec 2018	Horncastle Arena, Christchurch, New Zealand	Won Pro Box New Zealand light-middleweight title
20	Win	18–1 (1)	Luke Woods	UD	10	7 Sep 2018	Hornby Working Men's Club, Christchurch, New Zealand	Retained IBO Asia Pacific welterweight title
19	Win	17–1 (1)	Shay Brock	UD	10	22 Jun 2018	The Auckland Indian Association, Auckland, New Zealand	Won NZPBA light-middleweight title
18	Win	16–1 (1)	Andres Delfin Rodriguez	KO	8 (10), 2:08	4 May 2018	Hornby Working Men's Club, Christchurch, New Zealand	Won Pro Box Pacific light-middleweight title
17	Win	15–1 (1)	James Bishop	UD	6	24 Feb 2018	Hotel Motueka, Motueka, New Zealand	
16	Win	14–1 (1)	Stevie Ongen Ferdinandus	KO	3 (10)	8 Dec 2017	Hornby Working Men's Club, Christchurch, New Zealand	Won IBO Asia Pacific welterweight title
15	Win	13–1 (1)	Ben Nelson	TKO	1 (6)	3 Nov 2017	ABA Stadium, Auckland, New Zealand	
14	Win	12–1 (1)	Paitoon Jaikom	UD	8	7 Jul 2017	Hornby Working Men's Club, Christchurch, New Zealand	
13	Win	11–1 (1)	Gunnar Jackson	UD	10	7 Apr 2017	Hornby Working Men's Club, Christchurch, New Zealand	Won vacant IBO Oceania-Orient light-middleweight title
12	Win	10–1 (1)	Ikani Falekaono	TKO	2 (8), 1:44	11 Feb 2017	Hornby Working Men's Club, Christchurch, New Zealand	
11	Win	9–1 (1)	Blake Bell	UD	6	18 Nov 2016	Hornby Working Men's Club, Christchurch, New Zealand	
10	Win	8–1 (1)	Gunnar Jackson	UD	8	1 Oct 2016	Vodafone Events Centre, Auckland, New Zealand	
9	Loss	7–1 (1)	Kris George	TKO	3 (8)	21 Jul 2016	Horncastle Arena, Christchurch, New Zealand	
8	Win	7–0 (1)	Ben Kite	TKO	2 (6), 1:41	21 May 2016	Vodafone Events Centre, Auckland, New Zealand	
7	Win	6–0 (1)	Daniel Maxwell	UD	10	5 Mar 2016	Addington Raceway, Christchurch, New Zealand	Won vacant NZNBF welterweight title
6	Win	5–0 (1)	Rene Raschka	TKO	3 (4)	27 Nov 2015	Lincoln Event Centre, Christchurch, New Zealand	
5	NC	4–0 (1)	Nuka Gemmell	NC	3 (6)	1 Aug 2015	Stadium Southland, Invercargill, New Zealand	
4	Win	4–0	Luke Travers	TKO	2 (6), 0:22	13 Jun 2015	Arena Manawatu, Palmerston North, New Zealand	
3	Win	3–0	Shaun Colmore	UD	6	16 May 2015	Aratuna Freighters Warehouse, Greymouth, New Zealand	
2	Win	2–0	Ivana Siau	UD	6	5 Mar 2015	Vodafone Events Centre, Auckland, New Zealand	
1	Win	1–0	Martin Mech	TKO	3 (6), 2:28	5 Dec 2014	Hornby Working Men's Club, Christchurch, New Zealand	
