= Boxing at the 2015 Pan American Games – Men's welterweight =

Men's welterweight at the 2015 Pan American Games
- Venue: Oshawa Sports Centre
- Dates: July 19–25
- Competitors: 10 from 10 nations

Medalists
Gold medal	Gabriel Maestre	Venezuela
Silver medal	Roniel Iglesias	Cuba
Bronze medal	Juan Ramón Solano	Dominican Republic
Bronze medal	Alberto Palmetta	Argentina

The men's welterweight competition of the boxing events at the 2015 Pan American Games in Toronto, Ontario, Canada, was held between the 19 and 25 of July at the Oshawa Sports Centre. The defending champion is Carlos Banteux of Cuba. Welterweights is limited to those boxers weighing less than or equal to 69 kilograms.

Like all Pan American boxing events, the competition is a straight single-elimination tournament. Both semifinal losers are awarded bronze medals, so no boxers compete again after their first loss. Bouts consist of a 3 rounds "10-point must" scoring system used in the pro game, where the winner of each round must be awarded 10 points and the loser a lesser amount, and the elimination of the padded headgear. Five judges scored each bout. The winner will be the boxer who scored the most at the end of the match.

== Qualification ==
A total of ten boxers qualified to compete.

== Results ==
=== Bracket ===
Preliminaries; July 19, 2015
Sasan Hagnighat-joo (CAN)	1
Roberto de Queiroz (BRA)	2
Marvin Cabrera (MEX)	3
Brian Ceballo (USA)	0

Quarterfinals; July 21, 2015
Gabriel Maestre (VEN)	3
Roberto de Queiroz (BRA)	0
Lester Silva (NCA)	0
Juan Ramón Solano (DOM)	3
Carl Hield (BAH)	0
Alberto Palmetta (ARG)	3
Marvin Cabrera (MEX)	0
Roniel Iglesias (CUB)	3

Semifinals; July 23, 2015
Gabriel Maestre (VEN)	3
Juan Ramón Solano (DOM)	0
Alberto Palmetta (ARG)	0
Roniel Iglesias (CUB)	3

Finals; July 25, 2015
Gabriel Maestre (VEN)	2
Roniel Iglesias (CUB)	1
