= GB Amateur Boxing Championships =

Boxing competitions

The GB Amateur Boxing Championships is an amateur boxing tournament, founded in 2010, in which boxers from England, Scotland and Wales compete over a two-day period. It is hosted by the British Amateur Boxing Association (BABA), which was established in October 2008.

== 2010 GB Amateur Boxing Championships ==
The inaugural Amateur Boxing Championships of Britain were held in Echo Arena, Liverpool over 12 and 13 November 2010. These championships saw a repeat of the 60 kg Commonwealth Games final which were held in Delhi earlier in the year, when Salisbry ABC's Tom Stalker took on Josh Taylor of Scotland, once again Stalker earned a narrow victory in front of his home crowd to become the first 60 kg GB champion. The host city also produced the winner of a closely contested female bout at the 60 kg lightweight category, when Rotunda ABC's Natasha Jonas pipped Hartlepool's Amanda Coulson by one point. Rotunda ABC's Callum Smith, the youngest of the Smith brothers, also boxed his way to a gold medal in the 69 kg category when he took on fellow Scouser Anthony Fowler of Golden Gloves ABC. Northside ABC's Tommy Stubbs recorded a victory over Wales' Andrew Selby in the 52 kg Flyweight division. BBC provided coverage of the tournament.

== 2011 GB Amateur Boxing Championships ==
The 2011 GB Amateur Boxing Championships were staged at York Hall, London on 11 and 12 November 2011. The most hotly anticipated bout going into the second GB Championships was in the flyweight division between Welshman Andrew Selby and Khalid Yafai of England. After both boxers had got past the quarter-final stage of 2011 World Amateur Boxing Championships in Baku one month previous, it meant they would have to box off for a place at the 2012 Summer Olympics if neither boxer took gold in Azerbaijan, and Selby missed that achievement by the narrowest of margins in the final, losing 13:12. The pair met on 11 November for the first of a scheduled three fights to decide which boxer would secure Olympic qualification, with Selby recording a convincing 26:12 victory. On 12 November it was reported that Yafai had pulled out of their next encounter because he couldn't make the weight, thus granting the Welshman Olympic qualification and denying Yafai of a second Olympic Games. In other bouts, Warren Baister claimed gold with an impressive win in the 91 kg final. Salisbury ABC's Sam Maxwell earned a hard-fought 16:14 win over Wales' Joe Cordina who had beaten tournament favorite Iain Weaver the previous day. Another Liverpool boxer, Anthony Fowler beat Kieran Smith 15:9, and his conqueror of last year's championships, Callum Smith won at the 75 kg division. In the female contest, Amanda Coulsen beat Chantelle Cameron in a competitive bout, Natasha Jonas who denied Coulson of gold last year did not enter, neither did Olympians Tom Stalker, Anthony Joshua and Luke Campbell. BBC once again broadcast the event on BBC One and betting operator Betfair sponsored Team GB.

== 2012 GB Amateur Boxing Championships ==
The third GB Amateur Boxing Championships took place at the Troxy in London over Saturday 19 May/ Sunday 20 May 2012. The entries for the competition were somewhat more limited than those of recent years due to the final men's Olympic qualifier which took place in Trabzon, Turkey the month previous, therefore no Olympians entered. Great Britain Performance Director, Robert McCracken said, "It will be a fantastic opportunity to assess the next generation and identify some of the talents that will be challenging to be part of the GB squad for the next cycle." A selection of the event's final bouts were broadcast live on BBC channel, BBC Two and the tournament was sponsored by Betfair for a second successive year. The most notable bouts of the finals took place in the 56 kg and 91+kg categories as Leeds boxer Qais Ashfaq boxed cleverly to overcome Wales' Sean McGoldrick who had already beat him in a previous bout. The super-heavyweight final involved Joe Joyce and Frazer Clark who landed punishing blows on each other for 4 thrilling rounds, which Joyce shaded by a single point by a score of 37:36. Also, Liverpool puncher Anthony Fowler, who boxes out of Golden Gloves ABC, claimed his second Great British title in as many years with a victory over Tamuka Muchapondwa by a convincing score of 28:14, while 49 kg Jack Bateson beat Ashley Williams 21:17 to claim gold.

2012 Results
Class	First	Second	Score
Light flyweight, 49 kg	Jack Bateson (ENG)	Ashley Williams (WAL)	21–17
Flyweight, 52 kg	Jay Harris (WAL)	Joe McCulley (ENG)	27–21
Bantamweight, 56 kg	Qais Ashfaq (ENG)	Sean McGoldrick (WAL)	20–15
Lightweight, 60 kg	Charles Flynn (SCO)	Zack Davies (WAL)	24-24 (111-109 on countback)
Light welterweight, 64 kg	Lewis Benson (SCO)	Robbie Davies (ENG)	16–13
Welterweight, 69 kg	Anthony Fowler (ENG)	Tamuka Muchapondwa (ENG)	28–14
Middleweight, 75 kg	Danny Dignum (ENG)	Kieran Smith (SCO)	21–15
Light heavyweight, 81 kg	Lawrence Osueke (ENG)	Kirk Garvey (ENG)	15–13
Heavyweight, 91 kg	Simon Barclay (ENG)	Steven Lavelle (SCO)	21–14
Super heavyweight, 91+ kg	Joseph Joyce (ENG)	Frazer Clarke (ENG)	37–36
