= Danny Quartermaine =

English boxer (born 1997)

Personal information
- Born: 28 June 1997 (age 29) Warwick, Warwickshire, England
- Height: 5 ft 7 in (170 cm)
- Weight: Super-featherweight

Boxing career
- Stance: Orthodox

Boxing record
- Total fights: 17
- Wins: 14
- Win by KO: 4
- Losses: 1
- Draws: 2

Danny Quartermaine (born 28 June 1997) is an English professional boxer. He is a former IBF European and WBO European super-featherweight champion.

== Career ==
After an amateur career which saw him win 75 of 89 bouts, Quartermaine made his professional boxing debut with a four-round points victory over Ibrar Riyaz at the Holte Suite, Villa Park, in Birmingham on 22 February 2020.

Unbeaten in his first 10 pro-fights, he claimed the vacant IBF European super-featherweight title when his opponent, Romanian boxer Alex Rat, retired on his stool at the end of the fourth round at Coventry Skydome on 9 March 2024.

Returning to Coventry Skydome for his next outing on 29 June 2024, Quartermaine overcame being knocked to the canvas in the first round to beat James Chereji via unanimous decision to retain his championship and add the vacant WBO European super-featherweight title to his collection.

He defended both his titles against Jack Bateson at Park Community Arena in Sheffield on 7 December 2024, but the contest was halted in the second round and declared a technical draw on the ringside doctors' advice after both fighters suffered serious cuts in an accidental clash of heads.

Quartermaine defeated Jayro Fernando Duran on points in a six-round non-title bout at the Holiday Inn, Birmingham Airport, on 7 June 2025. The fight was meant to be a warm-up for a defence of his European titles against undefeated Royston Barney-Smith at Bournemouth International Centre on 26 July 2025, but the challenger withdrew due to injury. The contest was rescheduled to take place at the O2 Arena in London on 25 October 2025. Quartermaine was knocked to the canvas in the final round and, although he recovered to continue the fight, lost by unanimous decision.

== Professional boxing record ==
17 fights	14 wins	1 loss
By knockout	4	0
By decision	10	1
Draws	2	

No.	Result	Record	Opponent	Type	Round, time	Date	Location	Notes
17	Win	14–1–2	Fernando Joaquin Valdez	PTS	6	11 Sep 2026	Sports Connexion, Coventry, England	
16	Draw	13–1–2	Kurt Jackson	PTS	10	27 Mar 2026	Sports Connexions, Coventry, England	
15	Loss	13–1–1	Royston Barney-Smith	UD	10	25 Oct 2025	The O2 Arena, London, England	Lost IBF European and WBO European super-featherweight titles
14	Win	13–0–1	Jayro Fernando Durán	PTS	6	7 Jun 2025	Holiday Inn, Birmingham, England	
13	Draw	12–0–1	Jack Bateson	TD	2 (10), 2:19	7 Dec 2024	Park Community Arena, Sheffield, England	Retained IBF European and WBO European super-featherweight titles; TD: Both boxers cut from accidental head clash
12	Win	12–0	James Chereji	UD	10	29 Jun 2024	Skydome, Coventry, England	Retained IBF European super-featherweight title; Won vacant WBO European super-featherweight title
11	Win	11–0	Alex Raț	RTD	4 (10), 3:00	9 Mar 2024	Skydome, Coventry, England	Won vacant IBF European super-featherweight title
10	Win	10–0	Jack Hillier	TD	6 (10)	14 Oct 2023	Sports Connexion, Coventry, England	Points TD: Hillier cut from an accidental head clash
9	Win	9–0	Christian López Florez	TKO	4 (4), 2:58	6 May 2023	bp pulse LIVE, Birmingham, England	
8	Win	8–0	Simas Volosinas	PTS	4	11 Mar 2023	Sports Connexion, Coventry, England	
7	Win	7–0	Sarjit De Guzman Singh Bansal	TKO	2 (6), 0:25	16 Dec 2022	Sports Connexion, Coventry, England	
6	Win	6–0	Cruz Pérez	PTS	6	30 Oct 2022	The Hangar Events Venue, Wolverhampton, England	
5	Win	5–0	Myron Patrick	TKO	1 (4)	2 Jul 2022	Planet Ice, Solihull, England	
4	Win	4–0	Dean Jones	PTS	4	13 Nov 2021	Skydome, Coventry, England	
3	Win	3–0	Dean Evans	PTS	6	23 Oct 2021	Holte Suite, Birmingham, England	
2	Win	2–0	Matar Sambou	PTS	4	4 Sep 2021	Holte Suite, Birmingham, England	
1	Win	1–0	Ibrar Riyaz	PTS	4	22 Feb 2020	Holte Suite, Birmingham, England	
