= Jack Bateson =

English boxer (born 1994)

Personal information
- Born: June 3, 1994 (age 32) Leeds, England
- Height: 5 ft 7 in (170 cm)
- Weight: Super-bantamweight; Featherweight
- Website: https://jackbateson.co.uk

Boxing career
- Stance: Orthodox

Boxing record
- Total fights: 22
- Wins: 20
- Win by KO: 6
- Losses: 1
- Draws: 1
Medal record
Men's amateur boxing
Representing England
European Championships
Bronze medal – third place	2013 Minsk	Light-flyweight
Commonwealth Youth Games
Gold medal – first place	2011 Douglas	Light-flyweight

Jack Samuel Bateson is an English professional boxer. As an amateur he won a gold medal at the 2011 Commonwealth Youth Games and bronze at the 2013 European Championships.

== Early life ==
Jack Samuel Bateson was born on 3 June 1994 in Leeds, England. He began boxing at the age of nine, explaining in an interview with Boxing Social, "I only started boxing when I were about nine because me older brother Tom packed up and I felt a bit sorry for me dad who coached him". He had his first amateur fight at the age of 12 and remained unbeaten in 12 bouts before suffering his first defeat while representing England, saying on the loss, "Before I knew it, I were unbeaten in 12 and boxing for England against Ireland. I lost by a point and cried my eyes out. I never wanted to experience that pain again."

He attended Allerton High School in Alwoodley, Leeds, achieving 10 GCSEs, before gaining a triple distinction in an Advanced Apprenticeship in Sporting Excellence course, eventually moving on to study for a foundation degree in Sports Coaching.

== Amateur career ==
During an amateur career in which he competed for Team GB, securing over 100 wins from 120 fights, he won gold medals at the 2011 Commonwealth Youth Games, the ABA Championships in 2012 at light-flyweight and again the following year at flyweight, and a bronze medal at the 2013 European Championships. He also competed at the 2011 European Youth Championships, 2012 Youth World Championships, 2013 World Championships and the 2014 European Union Championships.

== Professional career ==
Bateson made his professional debut on 1 September 2017, scoring a first-round technical knockout (TKO) victory over Zsolt Sarkozi at the Elland Road Banqueting Suite in Leeds.

After compiling a record of 12–0 (3 KOs), it was announced in June 2020 that he had signed a management deal with MTK Global.

Bateson challenged IBF European and WBO European super-featherweight champion Danny Quartermaine at Park Community Arena in Sheffield on 7 December 2024, but the contest was halted in the second round and declared a technical draw on the ringside doctors' advice after both fighters suffered serious cuts in an accidental clash of heads.

He faced Michael Conlan for the vacant WBC International featherweight title at 3Arena in Dublin, Ireland, on 5 September 2025, losing by stoppage in the fourth round.

== Professional boxing record ==
23 fights	20 wins	2 losses
By knockout	6	2
By decision	14	0
Draws	1	

No.	Result	Record	Opponent	Type	Round, time	Date	Location	Notes
23	Loss	20–2–1	Michael Conlan	TKO	4 (10), 2:50	5 Sep 2025	3Arena, Dublin, Ireland	For vacant WBC International featherweight title
22	Draw	20–1–1	Danny Quartermaine	TD	2 (10), 2:19	7 Dec 2024	Park Community Arena, Sheffield, England	For IBF European and WBO European super-featherweight titles
21	Win	20–1	Rakesh Lohchab	RTD	4 (6), 3:00	27 Sep 2024	Park Community Arena, Sheffield, England	
20	Win	19–1	Darwing Martinez	PTS	6	2 Mar 2024	Elland Road Banqueting Suite, Leeds, England	
19	Win	18–1	Ruslan Berchuk	TKO	5 (6), 2:41	24 Nov 2023	Elland Road Banqueting Suite, Leeds, England	
18	Loss	17–1	Shabaz Masoud	TKO	12 (12), 2:00	11 Nov 2022	Utilita Arena Sheffield, Sheffield, England	Lost WBA Inter-Continental super bantamweight title
17	Win	17–0	Diego Alberto Ruiz	UD	10	18 Jun 2022	Elland Road Banqueting Suite, Leeds, England	Won vacant WBA Inter-Continental super bantamweight title
16	Win	16–0	Stefan Nicolae	TKO	3 (6), 2:05	18 Mar 2022	Elland Road Banqueting Suite, Leeds, England	
15	Win	15–0	Ramez Mahmood	UD	10	12 Nov 2021	Elland Road Banqueting Suite, Leeds, England	Won vacant English super bantamweight title
14	Win	14–0	Felix Garcia	PTS	6	4 Sep 2021	Headingley Rugby Stadium, Leeds, England	
13	Win	13–0	Joe Ham	PTS	8	17 Apr 2021	University of Bolton Stadium, Bolton, England	
12	Win	12–0	Matt Craddock	PTS	6	13 Sep 2020	Hangar 34, Liverpool, England	
11	Win	11–0	Khvicha Gigolashvili	PTS	6	6 Sep 2019	Elland Road Banqueting Suite, Leeds, England	
10	Win	10–0	Bayardo Ramos	PTS	8	15 Jun 2019	First Direct Arena, Leeds, England	
9	Win	9–0	Pablo Narvaez	TKO	1 (8), 2:28	2 Mar 2019	Elland Road Banqueting Suite, Leeds, England	
8	Win	8–0	Elvis Guillen	PTS	6	23 Nov 2018	Elland Road Banqueting Suite, Leeds, England	
7	Win	7–0	Scott McCormack	PTS	6	7 Sep 2018	Elland Road Banqueting Suite, Leeds, England	
6	Win	6–0	Jose Hernandez	PTS	4	19 May 2018	Elland Road Banqueting Suite, Leeds, England	
5	Win	5–0	Rafael Castillo	PTS	4	20 Apr 2018	Elland Road Banqueting Suite, Leeds, England	
4	Win	4–0	Jose Aguilar	PTS	4	2 Mar 2018	Elland Road Banqueting Suite, Leeds, England	
3	Win	3–0	Brett Fidoe	PTS	4	24 Nov 2017	Elland Road Banqueting Suite, Leeds, England	
2	Win	2–0	Kamil Jaworek	TKO	2 (4), 1:18	21 Oct 2017	First Direct Arena, Leeds, England	
1	Win	1–0	Zsolt Sarkozi	TKO	1 (4), 2:29	1 Sep 2017	Elland Road Banqueting Suite, Leeds, England	
