= Judo at the 2017 Central American Games =

2017 judo competition

Judo at the 2017 Central American Games was held at the Managua, Nicaragua from 6 to 8 December 2017.

== Medalists ==
=== Men ===
Event	Gold	Silver	Bronze
55 kg	Luis Montes; Nicaragua	César Atz; Guatemala	Yuvini Sigüenza; El Salvador
60 kg	Julio Molina; Guatemala	Sebastián Sancho; Costa Rica	Jefryd García; Nicaragua
60 kg	Julio Molina; Guatemala	Sebastián Sancho; Costa Rica	Bernabé Vergara; Panama
66 kg	Ignacio Sancho; Costa Rica	Ronal González; Panama	Boris Najarro; Guatemala
66 kg	Ignacio Sancho; Costa Rica	Ronal González; Panama	Jonathan Rogel; El Salvador
73 kg	Gustavo López; El Salvador	Daniel Reyes; Nicaragua	Joshua Ortega; Panama
73 kg	Gustavo López; El Salvador	Daniel Reyes; Nicaragua	Kevin Monroy; Guatemala
81 kg	Juan Diego Turcios; El Salvador	Edgar Chub; Guatemala	Otoniel Martínez; Nicaragua
90 kg	Carlos Figueroa; El Salvador	José Luiz Ortega; Panama	David Guillén; Costa Rica
90 kg	Carlos Figueroa; El Salvador	José Luiz Ortega; Panama	Omar Avalos; Guatemala
100 kg	Jahi Cuningham; Guatemala	Moisés Frederick; Nicaragua	James Denham; Panama
+100 kg	Armando Pineda; Guatemala	Amílcar Quinteros; El Salvador	Quibian Waisome; Panama

=== Women ===
Event	Gold	Silver	Bronze
44 kg	Evelyn Solis; Guatemala	Jeniffer Sarria; Nicaragua	Nelis Santamaría; Panama
48 kg	Keyling Ruiz; Nicaragua	Némesis Candelo; Panama	Lesly Hernández; El Salvador
52 kg	Vicky Fonseca; Nicaragua	Kristine Jiménez; Panama	Viviana Ruiz; Guatemala
52 kg	Vicky Fonseca; Nicaragua	Kristine Jiménez; Panama	Stefany García; El Salvador
57 kg	Sayra Laguna; Nicaragua	Anna Tirado; Panama	Gelga Chic; Guatemala
63 kg	Miryam Roper; Panama	Yennifer Domínguez; Guatemala	Cergia David; Honduras
70 kg	Saraí Mendoza; El Salvador	Dunia Santos; Honduras	Jennifer Ortíz; Guatemala
78 kg	Keyla Navas; Guatemala	Marian Talavera; Nicaragua	not awarded
+78 kg	Kenia Rodríguez; Costa Rica	Marcela Canales; Honduras	not awarded

== Medal table ==
* Host nation (Nicaragua)

Rank	Nation	Gold	Silver	Bronze	Total
1	Guatemala (GUA)	5	3	6	14
2	Nicaragua (NIC)*	4	4	2	10
3	El Salvador (ESA)	4	1	4	9
4	Costa Rica (CRC)	2	1	1	4
5	Panama (PAN)	1	5	5	11
6	Honduras (HON)	0	2	1	3
7	Belize (BIZ)	0	0	0	0
Totals (7 entries)		16	16	19	51
