= Scott Fitzgerald (boxer) =

English boxer

Personal information
- Nicknames: Fitzy Mad Man
- Nationality: English
- Born: Scott William Fitzgerald; 13 December 1991 (age 34) Preston, Lancashire, England
- Height: 5 ft 10 in (178 cm)
- Weight: Light-middleweight; Welterweight; Super-middleweight; Super-welterweight

Boxing career
- Stance: Orthodox

Boxing record
- Total fights: 15
- Wins: 15
- Win by KO: 10
- Losses: 0
Medal record
Men's Boxing
Representing England
Commonwealth Games
Gold medal – first place	2014 Glasgow	Welterweight
English National Championships
Gold medal – first place	2013 Houghton-le-Spring	Light-middleweight
Bronze medal – third place	2015 Liverpool	Welterweight

Scott William Fitzgerald (born 13 December 1991) is an English professional boxer who is a former British super-welterweight champion. As an amateur, he won a gold medal in the welterweight division at the 2014 Commonwealth Games.

== Biography ==
Representing England, Fitzgerald won a gold medal in the welterweight division at the 2014 Commonwealth Games in Glasgow, Scotland, knocking opponent Mandeep Jangra from India to the canvas three times during the final which he took by unanimous decision. He was a member of the Team GB squad and competed for the British Lionhearts in the World Series of Boxing.

Fitzgerald turned professional in September 2015 signing a promotional deal with Eddie Hearn's Matchroom Boxing and made his pro-debut on 27 February 2016, stopping Ben Heap in the third of a scheduled four rounds at Manchester Arena.

He claimed his first professional title on 30 March 2019, winning the vacant WBA International super-welterweight belt thanks to a split decision success over Anthony Fowler in Liverpool.

Fitzgerald won the British super-welterweight title with a unanimous decision victory over Ted Cheeseman at Newcastle Arena on 19 October 2019.

In early 2020 he spent 12 days in rehab at Tony Adams’ Sporting Chance Clinic in a bid to tackle problems with gambling, drugs and alcohol. Fitzgerald vacated his British title due to his personal issues and having served time in prison on remand following his arrest for an alleged assault and subsequently admitting a charge of breach of the peace at Preston Magistrates' Court in November 2020.

He returned to the boxing ring on 1 May 2021 at Manchester Arena where he defeated France's Gregory Trenel via third-round stoppage.

In February 2022, Fitzgerald appeared at Preston Magistrates' Court where he admitted assaulting his girlfriend and was sentenced to an 18 month community order which included completing 30 days of rehabilitation activities to address his substance misuse and anger problems as well as being ordered to carry out 40 hours of unpaid work and pay a total of £180.

Fitzgerald was sentenced to 46 weeks in prison in May 2023 after pleading guilty at Preston Crown Court to causing grievous bodily harm relating in a fight outside a pub on 22 November 2022 during which he broke a man’s jaw although he was released from custody soon after the court hearing due to having already spent six months behind bars on remand. The following month he was fined £150 at Preston Magistrates' Court after admitting two assault charges relating to an incident at a different pub on 13 November 2022.

In February 2024, Fitzgerald told the media he wanted to relaunch his boxing career after he was found not guilty of rape following a trial at Preston Crown Court stemming from an allegation for which he was first arrested in April 2020.

== Professional boxing record ==
15 fights	15 wins	0 losses
By knockout	10	0
By decision	5	0

No.	Result	Record	Opponent	Type	Round, time	Date	Location	Notes
15	Win	15–0	Gregory Trenel	TKO	3 (8), 2:43	1 May 2021	AO Arena, Manchester, England	
14	Win	14–0	Ted Cheeseman	UD	12	19 Oct 2019	Utilita Arena, Newcastle, England	Won British super-welterweight title
13	Win	13–0	Anthony Fowler	SD	10	30 Mar 2019	Echo Arena, Liverpool, England	Won vacant WBA International super-welterweight title
12	Win	12–0	Filip Rzadek	TKO	2 (6), 1:24	2 Feb 2019	The O2 Arena, London, England	
11	Win	11–0	Craig Morris	TKO	10 (10), 2:13	8 Sep 2018	Arena Birmingham, Birmingham, England	
10	Win	10–0	Laszlo Fazekas	PTS	8	21 Apr 2018	Echo Arena, Liverpool, England	
9	Win	9–0	Ishmael Tetteh	TKO	1 (6), 2:10	25 Feb 2018	Victoria Warehouse Hotel, Manchester, England	
8	Win	8–0	Bradley Pryce	TKO	5 (8), 1:37	30 Sep 2017	Echo Arena, Liverpool, England	
7	Win	7–0	Raimonds Sniedze	TKO	2 (4), 1:10	15 Jul 2017	Winter Gardens, Blackpool, England	
6	Win	6–0	Andrej Cepur	TKO	4 (8), 1:57	11 Mar 2017	Guild Hall, Preston, England	
5	Win	5–0	Adam Jones	PTS	6	15 Oct 2016	Echo Arena, Liverpool, England	
4	Win	4–0	Darryl Sharp	PTS	4	30 Jul 2016	First Direct Arena, Leeds, England	
3	Win	3–0	Gabor Balogh	TKO	2 (4), 1:52	29 May 2016	Goodison Park, Liverpool, England	
2	Win	2–0	Robert Studzinski	TKO	2 (4), 2:45	2 Apr 2016	Echo Arena, Liverpool, England	
1	Win	1–0	Ben Heap	TKO	3 (4), 1:45	27 Feb 2016	Manchester Arena, Manchester, England	
