= Boxing at the 2018 Commonwealth Games – Men's middleweight =

Boxing competitions

Boxing – Men's middleweight at the 2018 Commonwealth Games
- Venue: Oxenford Studios
- Dates: 6 – 14 April 2018
- Competitors: 23 from 23 nations

Medalists
| gold medal | Vikas Krishan Yadav | India |
| silver medal | Wilfried Ntsengue | Cameroon |
| bronze medal | Steven Donnelly | Northern Ireland |
| bronze medal | John Docherty | Scotland |

The men's middleweight boxing competitions at the 2018 Commonwealth Games in Gold Coast, Australia took place between 6 and 14 April at Oxenford Studios. Middleweights were limited to those boxers weighing less than 75 kilograms.

Like all Commonwealth boxing events, the competition was a straight single-elimination tournament. Both semifinal losers were awarded bronze medals, so no boxers competed again after their first loss. Bouts consisted of three rounds of three minutes each, with one-minute breaks between rounds. Beginning this year, the competition was scored using the "must-ten" scoring system.

== Schedule ==
The schedule is as follows:

All times are Australian Eastern Standard Time (UTC+10)

| Date | Time | Round |
|---|---|---|
| Friday 6 April 2018 | 12:47 & 19:17 | Round of 32 |
| Sunday 8 April 2018 | 14:02 & 20:32 | Round of 16 |
| Wednesday 11 April 2018 | 14:32 | Quarter-finals |
| Friday 13 April 2018 | 20:32 | Semi-finals |
| Saturday 14 April 2018 | 20:02 | Final |

== Results ==
The draw is as follows:

Round of 32
Joshua Redhead (GRN)
Campbell Somerville (AUS) | RSC
Steven Donnelly (NIR) | 4
Kyran Jones (WAL) | 1
Henry Tyrell (SAM) | RSC
Kokole Paneng (LES)
Marvin Anthony (LCA) | 0
Wilfried Ntsengue (CMR) | 5
Selemani Kidunda (TAN) | 2
Edwin Owuor (KEN) | 3
Don Vilitama (NIU)
Dariel Ebanks (CAY) | W/O
Jean Alberte (MRI) | 0
John Docherty (SCO) | 5

Round of 16
Vikas Krishan Yadav (IND) | 5
Campbell Somerville (AUS) | 0
Roy Cooke (DMA)
Benny Muziyo (ZAM) | KO
Gibrilla Kamara (SLE) | 0
Steven Donnelly (NIR) | 5
Henry Tyrell (SAM) | 5
Kenwal Hodge (AIA) | 0
Musah Rahman Lawson (GHA) | 1
Wilfried Ntsengue (CMR) | 4
Edwin Owuor (KEN) | 0
Ryan Scaife (NZL) | 5
Benjamin Whittaker (ENG) | 5
Dariel Ebanks (CAY) | 0
John Docherty (SCO) | 5
Andreas Kokkinos (CYP) | 0

Quarterfinals
Vikas Krishan Yadav (IND) | 5
Benny Muziyo (ZAM) | 0
Steven Donnelly (NIR) | 5
Henry Tyrell (SAM) | 0
Wilfried Ntsengue (CMR) | 5
Ryan Scaife (NZL) | 0
Benjamin Whittaker (ENG) | 1
John Docherty (SCO) | 4

Semifinals
Vikas Krishan Yadav (IND) | 5
Steven Donnelly (NIR) | 0
Wilfried Ntsengue (CMR) | 5
John Docherty (SCO) | 0

Final
Vikas Krishan Yadav (IND) | 5
Wilfried Ntsengue (CMR) | 0
