= John Docherty (boxer) =

Scottish boxer

Personal information
- Nationality: Scottish
- Born: 30 October 1997 (age 28) Inverness, Scotland
- Weight: Super-middleweight

Boxing career
- Stance: Southpaw

Boxing record
- Total fights: 13
- Wins: 12
- Win by KO: 9
- Losses: 1
Medal record
Men's amateur boxing
Representing Scotland
Commonwealth Games
Bronze medal – third place	2018 Gold Coast	Middleweight
Commonwealth Youth Games
Gold medal – first place	2015 Samoa	Middleweight

John Docherty (born 30 October 1997) is a retired Scottish professional boxer. He won a bronze medal at the 2018 Commonwealth Games representing Scotland in the middleweight division.

== Amateur career ==
Docherty won the British junior championships in 2012 and 2013. In 2015, he won gold at the Commonwealth Youth Games and silver at the European Youth championships. In 2017, Docherty won gold at the Scottish Elite Championships and the GB Three Nations Championships at senior level. He won a bronze medal at the 2018 Commonwealth Games.

== Professional career ==
In 2018, Docherty turned professional signing a promotional deal with Matchroom Boxing. On 13 October, he won his professional debut with an 18 second knockout over Jordan Latimer.

Docherty retired at the age of 25 in late 2022, to the surprise of many, citing medical concerns.

== Professional boxing record ==
13 fights	12 wins	1 loss
By knockout	9	0
By decision	3	1

No.	Result	Record	Opponent	Type	Round, time	Date	Location	Notes
13	Win	12–1	(United Kingdom) Jordan Grant	KO	2 (8), 2:49	26 Feb 2022	(United Kingdom) SSE Hydro, Glasgow, Scotland	
12	Win	11–1	(Latvia) Kristaps Zulgis	KO	3 (6), 1:33	19 Feb 2022	(United Kingdom) Trump Turnberry, Turnberry, South Ayrshire, Scotland	
11	Win	10–1	(United Kingdom) Darryl Sharp	PTS	6	14 Nov 2021	(United Kingdom) Barnsley Metrodome, Barnsley, England	
10	Loss	9–1	(United Kingdom) Jack Cullen	UD	10	14 Nov 2020	(United Kingdom) Wembley Arena, London, England	
9	Win	9–0	(United Kingdom) Anthony Fox	TKO	7 (8), 1:02	14 Aug 2020	(United Kingdom) Matchroom Fight Camp, Brentwood, England	
8	Win	8–0	(Nicaragua) Pablo Mendoza	TKO	1 (6), 3:00	8 Feb 2020	(United Kingdom) FlyDSA Arena, Sheffield, England	
7	Win	7–0	(United Kingdom) Lewis van Poetsch	PTS	6	19 Oct 2019	(United Kingdom) Metro Radio Arena, Newcastle, England	
6	Win	6–0	(United Kingdom) Darryl Sharp	PTS	4	2 Aug 2019	(United Kingdom) Exhibition Centre, Liverpool, England	
5	Win	5–0	(Nicaragua) Wilmer Gonzalez	TKO	1 (4)	18 May 2019	(United Kingdom) SSE Hydro, Glasgow, Scotland	
4	Win	4–0	(United Kingdom) Yailton Neves	TKO	2 (4), 2:59	2 Mar 2019	(United Kingdom) East of England Arena, Peterborough, England	
3	Win	3–0	(Poland) Przemyslaw Binienda	TKO	1 (4), 1:59	2 Feb 2019	(United Kingdom) The O2 Arena, London, England	
2	Win	2–0	(Argentina) Angel Mariano Castillo	TKO	2 (4), 0:59	30 Nov 2018	Teatro Obi Hall, Florence, Italy	
1	Win	1–0	(United Kingdom) Jordan Latimer	KO	1 (4), 0:18	13 Oct 2018	(United Kingdom) Metro Radio Arena, Newcastle, England	
