= Royston Barney-Smith =

British boxer (born 2004)

Personal information
- Nickname: Sugar Boy Roy
- Nationality: British
- Born: 4 January 2004 (age 22) Poole, Dorset, England
- Weight: Super featherweight

Boxing career
- Stance: Southpaw

Boxing record
- Total fights: 17
- Wins: 17
- Win by KO: 8
- Losses: 0

Royston Barney-Smith (born 4 January 2004) is a British professional boxer. He has held the British and Commonwealth super-featherweight titles since April 2026. He previously held the IBF European and WBO European super-featherweight titles.

== Early life ==
Barney-Smith was born in Poole but grew up in Southampton where was he was coached by boxing trainer Wayne Batten.

== Amateur career ==
Barney-Smith had a highly successful amateur career with a record of 45–5 and winning gold at the 2017 and 2018 European championships. He was expected to compete at the 2024 Olympics but decided to turn pro instead.

== Professional career ==
Barney-Smith made his debut on the undercard of David Avanesyan vs Oskari Metz on 19 March 2022, at the Wembley Arena.

He was scheduled to challenge IBF European and WBO European super-featherweight champion Danny Quartermaine at Bournemouth International Centre on 26 July 2025, but withdrew due to injury. The contest was rescheduled to take place at the O2 Arena in London on 25 October 2025. Barney-Smith won by unanimous decision.

Barney-Smith defeated Conor McIntosh by second round technical knockout to win the vacant British and Commonwealth super-featherweight titles at the OVO Hydro in Glasgow on 17 April 2026.

He faced Reece Bellotti for the vacant IBO Intercontinental super-featherweight title at 3Arena in Dublin, Ireland, on 1 August 2026. He won via unanimous decision.

== Professional boxing record ==
17 fights	17 wins	0 losses
By knockout	8	0
By decision	9	0

No.	Result	Record	Opponent	Type	Round, time	Date	Location	Notes
17	Win	17–0	Reece Bellotti	UD	10	1 Aug 2026	3Arena, Dublin, Ireland	Retained WBO European super-featherweight title and won vacant IBO Intercontinental super-featherweight title
16	Win	16–0	Conor McIntosh	TKO	2 (12), 2:29	17 Apr 2026	OVO Hydro, Glasgow, Scotland	Won vacant British and Commonwealth super-featherweight titles
15	Win	15–0	Danny Quartermaine	UD	10	25 Oct 2025	The O2 Arena, London, England	Won IBF European and WBO European super-featherweight titles
14	Win	14–0	Cesar Ignacio Paredes	PTS	8	5 Apr 2025	Co-op Live Arena, Manchester, England	
13	Win	13–0	Andres Navarrete	KO	5 (8), 2:57	7 Dec 2024	Wembley Arena, London, England	
12	Win	12–0	Carlos Rayo	KO	2 (8), 1:25	18 Oct 2024	York Hall, London, England	
11	Win	11–0	Brian Barajas	UD	8	27 Jul 2024	The O2 Arena, London, England	Won vacant WBO Youth super-featherweight title
10	Win	10–0	Jonatas Rodrigo Gomes De Olivira	PTS	8	11 May 2024	York Hall, Bethnal Green, London, England	
9	Win	9–0	Jose Manuel Perez	KO	4 (8), 1:20	22 Mar 2024	York Hall, London, England	
8	Win	8–0	Maicol Velazco	TKO	3 (6), 1:24	1 Dec 2023	York Hall, London, England	
7	Win	7–0	Engel Gomez	PTS	6	23 Sept 2023	Wembley Arena, London, England	
6	Win	6–0	Christian Lopez Flores	PTS	6	9 Jun 2023	York Hall, London, England	
5	Win	5–0	Lesther Lopez	KO	1 (4), 1:07	17 Feb 2023	York Hall, London, England	
4	Win	4–0	Cruz Perez	TKO	1 (4), 1:07	3 Dec 2022	Tottenham Hotspur Stadium, London, England	
3	Win	3–0	Paul Holt	TKO	1 (4), 0:36	16 Sept 2022	York Hall, London, England	
2	Win	2–0	Constantin Radoi	PTS	4	23 April 2022	Wembley Stadium, London, England	
1	Win	1–0	Adan Martinez	PTS	1 (4)	19 Mar 2022	Wembley Arena, London, England	
