= Triathlon at the 2017 Central American Games =

- Dates: 16–17 December
- Competitors: 37 from 7 nations

Triathlon at the 2017 Central American Games was held at the San Juan del Sur, Nicaragua from 16 December to 17 December. Both men and women competed in individual events, plus a mixed-gendered relay event.

The individual triathlon contained three components: a 1.5 km swim, 40 km cycle, and a 10 km run. The relay event featured teams of four competitors, where each completed a 300 m swim, a 6.3 km cycle, and a 2.1 km run.

== Participating nations ==
A total of 37 athletes from 7 nations competed in triathlon at the 2017 Central American Games

== Schedule ==
F	Final

Event↓/Date →	16th Sat	17th Sun
Men's individual	F	
Women's individual	F	
Mixed relay		F

== Medalists ==
Event	Gold		Silver		Bronze	
Men's individual	Peter Vega; Panama	2:03:48	Pablo Herrera; Costa Rica	2:05:11	Armando Abaunza; Panama	2:06:49
Women's individual	Alia Cardinale Villalobos; Costa Rica	2:20:49	Raquel Solis Guerrero; Costa Rica	2:24:44	Barbara Schoenfeld; Guatemala	2:27:44
Mixed relay	Costa Rica; Alia Cardinale Villalobos; Luis Diego Piedra Rojas; Raquel Solis Guerrero; Federico Venegas	1:37:53	Guatemala; Gabriela Rodríguez; Gerardo Vergara; Barbara Schoenfeld; Jose Antonio Saenz Merida	1:39:41	Panama; Wendy Ducreux; Peter Vega; Margie Patricia Real; Armando Abaunza	1:41:36

== Medal table ==
* Host nation (Nicaragua)

Rank	Nation	Gold	Silver	Bronze	Total
1	Costa Rica (CRC)	2	2	0	4
2	Panama (PAN)	1	0	2	3
3	Guatemala (GUA)	0	1	1	2
Totals (3 entries)		3	3	3	9
