= Khuseyn Baysangurov =

Russian boxer (born 1994)

Khuseyn Baysangurov Хусейн Байсангуров
Personal information
- Nationality: Russian
- Born: Хусейн Увайсович Байсангуров; 6 November 1994 (age 31) Samashki, Achkhoy-Martanovsky, Chechnya, Russia
- Height: 5 ft 9 1/2 in (177 cm)
- Weight: Welterweight; Light-middleweight

Boxing career
- Stance: Orthodox

Boxing record
- Total fights: 24
- Wins: 23
- Win by KO: 20
- Losses: 1
Medal record
Men's amateur boxing
Representing Russia
Youth World Championships
Gold medal – first place	2012 Yerevan	Lightweight

Khuseyn Uwaisovich Baysangurov (Russian: Хусейн Увайсович Байсангуров; born 6 November 1994) is a Russian professional boxer. He held the WBA Continental (Europe) and the IBF International light-middleweight titles from 2017 to 2018.

== Professional career ==
On 26 August 2017, Baysangurov defeated Estonian boxer Pavel Semjonov for the vacant WBA Continental (Europe) title in Moscow, Russia. He won the fight by technical knockout after Semjonov's corner stopped the bout following the end of the seventh round.

On 2 December, Baysangurov faced German boxer Nick Klappert in a unification bout involving the latter's IBF International title. He won the fight by knockout after Klappert turned his back leading to the referee stopping the bout at 2:39 of the opening round.

On 5 May 2018, Baysangurov is expected to defend his titles against Jose Antonio Villalobos in Baku, Azerbaijan. He knocked down Villalobos in the first round, before winning the bout in the middle of the sixth round when Villabos signaled his corner to throw in the towel.

On 2 October, Baysangurov faced Georgian boxer Malkhaz Sujashvili in Kyiv, Ukraine. He won the fight by technical knockout at 2:50 of the second round.

== Personal life ==
He is the cousin of former WBO and IBO light-middleweight champion Zaurbek Baysangurov. He is an ethnic Chechen of the teip Terloy.

== Professional boxing record ==
24 fights	23 wins	1 loss
By knockout	20	0
By decision	3	1
