= 2012 AIBA Youth World Boxing Championships =

Boxing competitions

2012 AIBA Youth World Boxing Championships logo

The 2012 AIBA Youth World Boxing Championships were held in Yerevan, Armenia, from November 25 to December 8, 2012. The competition is under the supervision of the world's governing body for amateur boxing AIBA and is the junior version of the World Amateur Boxing Championships. Boxers aged between 17 and 18 as of 1 January 2013 were eligible to compete.

== Medal winners ==
Event	Gold	Silver	Bronze
Light flyweight (–49 kg)	Lü Bin; China	Muradzon Akhmadaliyev; Uzbekistan	Lalitha Prasad Polipalli; India Jade Bornea; Philippines
Flyweight (–52 kg)	Oliver Simpson; England	Jeyvier Cintrón; Puerto Rico	Kurt Walker; Ireland Jorge Cordero; Cuba
Bantamweight (–56 kg)	Alexei Guibert; Cuba	Magomedrashid Dzhabrailov; Russia	Freddy Ortiz; Puerto Rico Omar El-Hag; Germany
Lightweight (–60 kg)	Khuseyn Baysangurov; Russia	Raúl Curiel; Mexico	Sofiane Oumiha; France Luis Torres; Venezuela
Light welterweight (–64 kg)	Kevin Hayler Brown; Cuba	Lester Martínez; Guatemala	Joshua Kelly; England Parviz Baghirov; Azerbaijan
Welterweight (–69 kg)	Akmalbek Kosimov; Uzbekistan	Artem Soloviov; Ukraine	Zhang Zhidi; China Osman Aydın; Turkey
Middleweight (–75 kg)	Oleksandr Khyzhniak; Ukraine	Magomed Madiev; Russia	Daulet Baigabatov; Kazakhstan Sandeep Sharma; India
Light heavyweight (–81 kg)	Nikol Arutyunov; Armenia	Scott Forrest; Scotland	Idris Shakhmanov; Russia Aleksandr Dokvadze; Georgia
Heavyweight (–91 kg)	Andrey Stotskiy; Russia	Paweł Wierzbicki; Poland	Jai Opetaia; Australia Danny Williams; England
Super heavyweight (+ 91 kg)	Hughie Fury; England	Narender Berwal; India	Narek Melkonyan; Armenia Florian Schulz; Germany

== Medal table ==
* Host nation (Armenia)

Rank	Nation	Gold	Silver	Bronze	Total
1	Russia	2	2	1	5
2	England	2	0	2	4
3	Cuba	2	0	1	3
4	Ukraine	1	1	0	2
4	Uzbekistan	1	1	0	2
6	Armenia*	1	0	1	2
6	China	1	0	1	2
8	India	0	1	2	3
9	Puerto Rico	0	1	1	2
10	Guatemala	0	1	0	1
10	Mexico	0	1	0	1
10	Poland	0	1	0	1
10	Scotland	0	1	0	1
14	Germany	0	0	2	2
15	Australia	0	0	1	1
15	Azerbaijan	0	0	1	1
15	France	0	0	1	1
15	Georgia	0	0	1	1
15	Ireland	0	0	1	1
15	Kazakhstan	0	0	1	1
15	Philippines	0	0	1	1
15	Turkey	0	0	1	1
15	Venezuela	0	0	1	1
Totals (23 entries)		10	10	20	40

== See also ==
- World Amateur Boxing Championships
