= Turcios =

Turcios is a surname. Notable people with the surname include:

- Danilo Turcios (born 1978), Honduran footballer
- Froylán Turcios (1875–1943), Honduran writer
- Juan Diego Turcios (born 1992), Salvadoran judoka
- José Rafael Carrera y Turcios (1814–1865), president of Guatemala
- Víctor Turcios (born 1988), Salvadoran footballer
