= Gabriel Maestre =

Venezuelan boxer (born 1986)

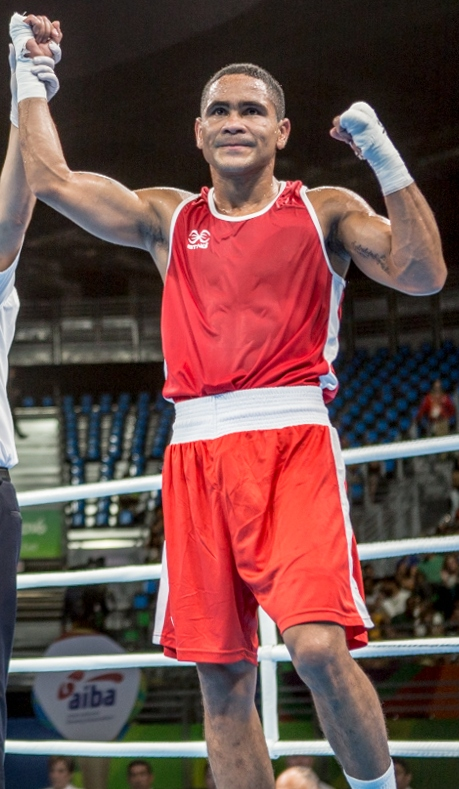

Personal information
- Born: Gabriel José Maestre Pérez; 22 July 1986 (age 39) Barcelona, Venezuela
- Height: 5 ft 10 1/2 in (179 cm)
- Weight: Welterweight; Light middleweight

Boxing career
- Reach: 73 in (185 cm)
- Stance: Orthodox

Boxing record
- Total fights: 8
- Wins: 6
- Win by KO: 5
- Losses: 1
- Draws: 1
Medal record
Men's amateur boxing
Representing Venezuela
ALBA Games
Gold medal – first place	2011 Barquisimeto	Welterweight
Bolivarian Games
Bronze medal – third place	2009 Sucre	Welterweight
Pan American Games
Gold medal – first place	2015 Toronto	Welterweight
Bronze medal – third place	2019 Lima	Welterweight
South American Games
Gold medal – first place	2014 Santiago de Chile	Welterweight
Gold medal – first place	2018 Cochabamba	Welterweight
World Championships
Bronze medal – third place	2013 Almaty	Welterweight

Gabriel José Maestre Pérez (Note: In this Spanish name, the first or paternal surname is Maestre and the second or maternal family name is Pérez.) (born 22 July 1986) is a Venezuelan professional boxer. As an amateur he competed at the 2012 and 2016 Summer Olympics, whilst also winning medals at the 2013 World Championships and the 2015 and 2019 Pan American Games.

== Amateur career ==
=== Olympic results ===
London 2012

- Round of 32: Defeated Amin Ghasemipour (Iran) 13–8
- Round of 16: Defeated Siphiwe Lusizi (South Africa) 18–13
- Quarter-finals: Defeated by Serik Sapiyev (Kazakhstan) 20–9

Rio 2016

- Round of 32: Defeated Arajik Marutjan (Germany) 2–1
- Round of 16: Defeated Vincenzo Mangiacapre (Italy) WO
- Quarter-finals: Defeated by Daniyar Yeleussinov (Kazakhstan) 3–0

=== World Championship results ===
Almaty 2013

- Round of 32: Defeated Imre Bácskai (Hungary) 2–1
- Round of 16: Defeated Ireneusz Zakrzewski (Poland) 3–0
- Quarter-finals: Defeated Alexander Besputin (Russia) 3–0
- Semi-finals: Defeated by Arisnoidys Despaigne (Cuba) 3–0

Doha 2015

- Round of 16: Defeated by Eimantas Stanionis (Lithuania) 3–0

=== Pan American Games results ===
Toronto 2015

- Quarter-finals: Defeated Roberto Queiroz (Brazil) 3–0
- Semi-finals: Defeated Juan Ramón Solano (Dominican Republic) 3–0
- Final: Defeated Roniel Iglesias (Cuba) 2–1

Lima 2019

- Quarter-finals: Defeated Luis Miranda (Peru) 5–0
- Semi–finals: Defeated by Rohan Polanco (Dominican Republic) 5–0

== Professional career ==
On 6 July 2019, Maestre made his professional debut against Jeovanis Barraza. Maestre won via technical knockout after knocking his opponent down twice in the second round which resulted in referee, Guillermo Perez Pineda, stepping in to stop the bout. On 19 December 2019 Maestre fought in his second professional fight against Diego Gabriel Chaves of Argentina. Maestre dropped Chaves to the canvas during the opening round, after which Chaves proceeded to clinch Maestre in an attempt of prolonging the bout. Maestre took control of the fight in the fourth round and dropped his opponent multiple times, which forced the corner of Chaves to throw in the towel.

Just shy of a year after his last bout, Maestre returned to the ring against Daniel Vega Cota. Maestro secured victory by knocking out his Mexican opponent in the opening minute of the first round after landing a heavy left uppercut.

On 7 August 2021, Maestre faced Mykal Fox for the vacant WBA interim welterweight title. Maestre was dropped in the second round by a left hook, and was seemingly outboxed through 12 rounds by his opponent. However, he was awarded with a highly controversial unanimous decision victory, with scores of 115-112, 117-110 and 114-113 all in his favor. There was outrage over the decision, with promoter Lou DiBella calling for a "federal investigation of boxing and the WBA".

On May 4, 2024 in Las Vegas, Maestre is scheduled to challenge Eimantas Stanionis for his WBA "Regular" welterweight title.

== Professional boxing record ==
8 fights	6 wins	1 loss
By knockout	5	0
By decision	1	1
Draws	1	

No.	Result	Record	Opponent	Type	Round, time	Date	Location	Notes
8	Loss	6–1–1	(Lithuania) Eimantas Stanionis	UD	12	4 May 2024	(United States) T-Mobile Arena, Paradise, Nevada, US	
7	Win	6–0–1	(United States) Travon Marshall	TKO	2 (10), 2:06	12 Aug 2023	(United States) MGM National Harbor, Oxon Hill, Maryland, U.S.	
6	Win	5–0–1	(United States) Devon Alexander	RTD	3 (10), 3:00	8 Apr 2023	(United States) Dignity Health Sports Park, Carson, California, U.S.	
5	Draw	4–0–1	(Ukraine) Taras Shelestyuk	SD	10	11 Mar 2022	Montreal Casino, Montreal, Canada	
4	Win	4–0	(United States) Mykal Fox	UD	12	7 Aug 2021	(United States) Minneapolis Armory, Minneapolis, Minnesota, US	Won vacant WBA interim welterweight title
3	Win	3–0	(Mexico) Daniel Vega Cota	KO	1 (10), 0:38	17 Dec 2020	Discoteca Kilymandiaro, Puerto Colombia, Colombia	
2	Win	2–0	(Argentina) Diego Gabriel Chaves	TKO	4 (10), 2:14	19 Dec 2019	Coliseo Sugar Baby Rojas, Barranquilla, Colombia	Retained WBA Fedebol super-welterweight title
1	Win	1–0	(Colombia) Jeovanis Barraza	TKO	2 (10), 2:16	6 Jul 2019	Coliseo Sugar Baby Rojas, Barranquilla, Colombia	Won vacant WBA Fedebol super-welterweight title

== Notes ==
Sporting positions
Regional boxing titles
Vacant Title last held by Yeison Gonzalez	WBA Fedebol super-welterweight champion 6 July 2019 – February 2020; Vacated	Vacant Title next held by Gerardo Luis Vergara
World boxing titles
Vacant Title last held by Jamal James	WBA welterweight interim champion 7–12 August 2021; Stripped	Title discontinued
