= Kharian, Sirsa =

Kharian
- Village
- Location within Haryana Location within India
- Coordinates: 29.618722°N 74.857879°E
- Country: India
- State: Haryana
- District: Sirsa
- Tehsils: Rania
- Established: near 170 year before

Government
  - Body: Gram Panchayat, Kharian
- Elevation: 188 m (617 ft)

Population (2001)
  - Total: 7,941

Languages
  - Official: English, Hindi
  - Regional: Bagri
- Time zone: UTC+5:30 (IST)
- PIN: 125076
- Telephone code: 91-01698
- Vehicle registration: HR-44
- Nearest city: Sirsa, Hisar, New Delhi, Chandigarh
- Sex ratio: 873
- Climate: Tropical desert
- Website: haryana.gov.in

Kharian is a village situated in Sirsa district, Haryana. It is situated 14 km away from National Nighway 9 (NH9). The main source of economic growth is agriculture supported by a number of canals flowing through the village.

However, Gram Panchayat Kharian also received a cheque for Rs 10 lakh as prize money for carrying out outstanding development work in the village. The prize was given by Om Prakash Chautala to the former Sarpanch, Ram Kumar Nain.

== Demographics ==
As of 2014 India census Kharian had a population of 16000. Male population was 8,239 and female population was 7,761.

== Geography ==
The location of Kharian is 29.61°N 74.85°E. It has an average elevation of 188 metres (620 feet).

=== Climate ===
Kharian can be classified as tropical desert, arid and hot; which is mainly dry with very hot summers and cold winters except during monsoon season when moist air of oceanic origin penetrate into the district. There are four seasons in a year. The hot weather season starts from mid March until the last week of June, followed by the south- west monsoon which lasts until September. The transition period from September to October forms the post-monsoon season. The winter season starts late in November and remains up to the first week of March.

Rainfall
Normal Annual Rainfall	318 mm
Normal monsoon Rainfall	253 mm
Normal Rain days	20
Temperature
Temperature Mean Maximum	41.1 °C(May&June)
Temperature Mean Maximum	5.1 °C(January)

== Religions and communities ==
Kharian has a number of communities including Jats, Bairagi, Bhatiwal, Mehta, Nai, and Meghwal. Approximately 80% of the population are Jaats the majority consisting of Nain.This village is known as Nain Gotra for example as Naino Wala Kharian. Nain(majority), Dehru (देहड़ू ,देड़ू ), Bana (बाना), Saharan, Swami (स्वामी), Bander, Niol, chhimpa, Kasnia, Poonia, Dhukia ढुकिया, Jakhar जाखड़, Nandewal and Bhadu (also, Bhadoo, भादो) gotras. Among the Mehta are Mehndiratta, Chawla, Kalra, Raheja, Julah, and Gera.

Most people of Kharian are of the Hindu religion, but there are also followers of the spiritual and philosophical group, Radha Soami Satsang Beas (RSSB).

Kharian has a temple of saint Sidh Yogi Baba Munganath Ji Also temples of Baba Ramdev Ji, Shri Radha Krishna, Shri Bajrang Bali Ji, Shree Sani Dev Ji, Shri Bhabhuta Sidh Ji, Shri Goga Ji, Shri Bhomia Ji and more others.The village kharian is a very religious. There is also a branch centre of the RSSB.

== Location ==
Kharian is situated at a distance of 25 kilometers from Sirsa. Kharian is well connected with nearby villages and cities like Hisar by regular bus service run by the Haryana Roadways

== Facilities ==
=== Schools and Teaching Institutions ===
- Ch. Devi Lal Library
- Kharian Public School
- Govt. Primary School
- Govt. Senior Secondary School
- Govt. Girls Senior Secondary School
- Maa Saraswati Play School
- Dr. APJ Abdul Kalam Library (Govt.)
- Kharian Coaching Center
- Adhyayan Library (Private)
- The sarvodhya play school(private)
- Sarvodhya play school(private)

(The sarvodhya school (private)

=== Banks ===
- State Bank Of India
- Sarva Haryana Gramin Bank
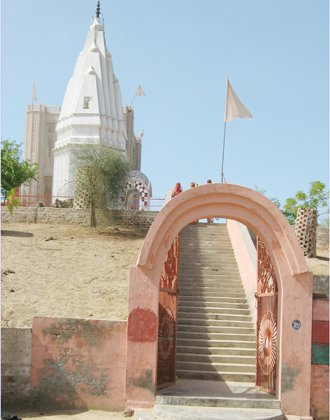
Baba Munganath Temple

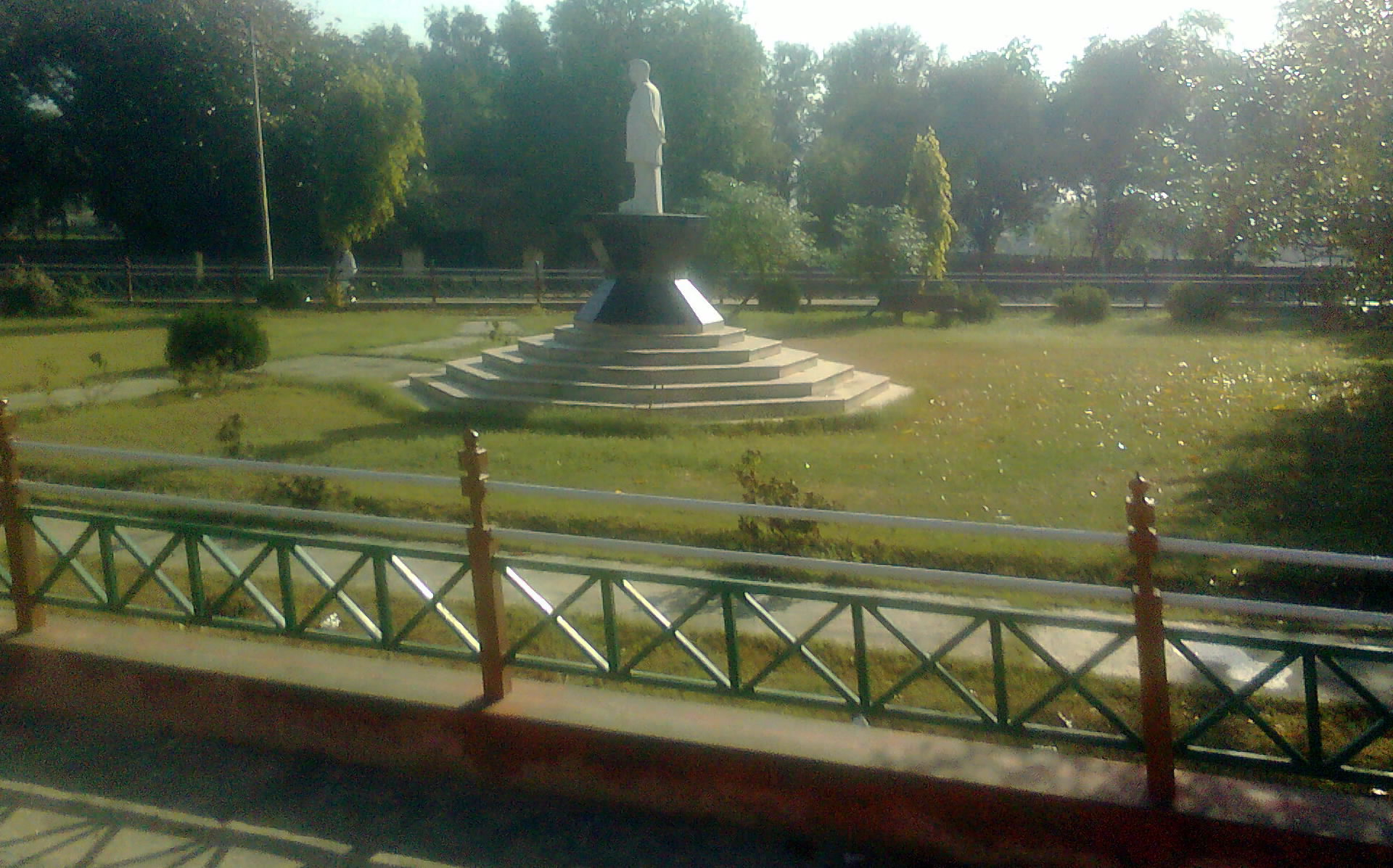
Ch.Devi Lal Park

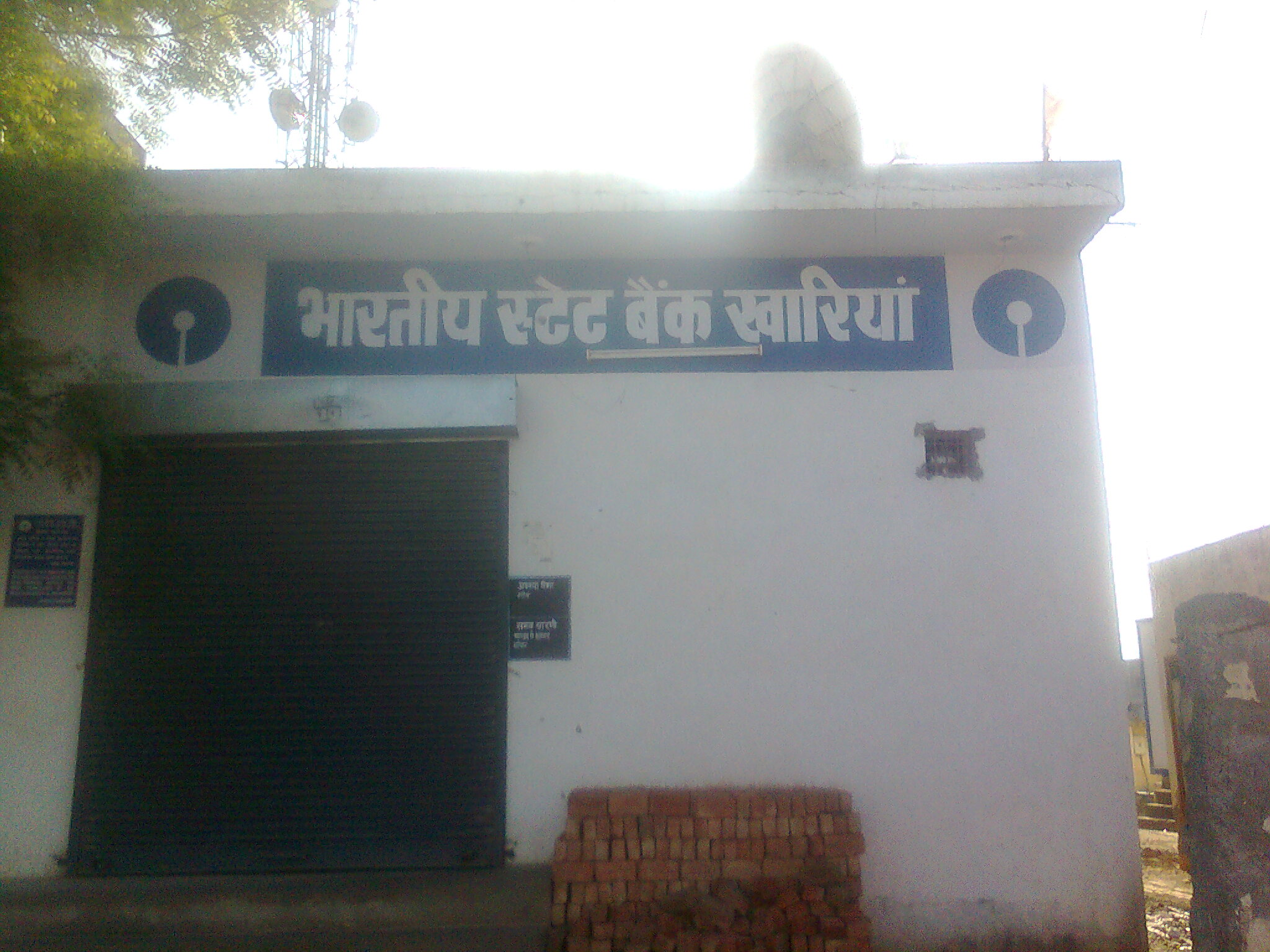
SBI kharian Kharian Skyline: https://www.youtube.com/watch?app=desktop&v=vM-l2KWJql0&t=1s&pp=ygUPS2hhcmlhbiBza3lsaW5l
