= 2017 Central American Games =

2017 sports competition

XI Central American Games XI Juegos Deportivos Centroamericanos
- Host city: Managua
- Country: Nicaragua
- Teams: 7
- Opening: December 3, 2017
- Closing: December 17, 2017
- Opened by: Daniel Ortega
- Main venue: Dennis Martínez National Stadium
- Website: Official website

The 2017 Central American Games, the XI edition of the Central American Games, were hosted in Managua, Nicaragua during 3–17 December 2017.

== Sports ==
- Athletics (Details)
- Basketball (Details)
- Handball (Details)
- Baseball (Details)
- Boxing (Details)
- Biking (Details)
- Swimming (Details)
- Fencing (Details)
- Football (Details)
- Golf (Details)
- Weightlifting (Details)
- Field hockey (Details)
- Karate (Details)
- Judo (Details)
- Wrestling (Details)
- Rowing (Details)
- Rugby sevens (Details)
- Taekwondo (Details)
- Tennis (Details)
- Table tennis (Details)
- Softball (Details)
- Surfing (Details)
- Triathlon (Details)
- Volleyball (Details)

In addition, four sports that are not part of the Olympic schedule will be included:

- Chess (Details)
- Billiards (Details)
- Bodybuilding (Details)
- Sambo (Details)

== Medal table ==
* Host nation (Nicaragua)

Rank	Nation	Gold	Silver	Bronze	Total
1	Guatemala (GUA)	110	87	90	287
2	Costa Rica (CRC)	69	62	48	179
3	Nicaragua (NIC)*	58	77	81	216
4	Panama (PAN)	41	55	63	159
5	El Salvador (ESA)	37	28	84	149
6	Honduras (HON)	27	32	47	106
7	Belize (BLZ)	2	4	6	12
Totals (7 entries)		344	345	419	1,108
