= Mohammed Rabii (boxer) =

Moroccan boxer (born 1993)

Personal information
- Nationality: Moroccan
- Born: 13 July 1993 (age 32)
- Height: 1.80 m (5 ft 11 in)
- Weight: Welterweight

Boxing career

Boxing record
- Total fights: 10
- Wins: 10
- Win by KO: 5
- Losses: 0
- Draws: 0
Medal record
Men's amateur boxing
Representing Morocco
Olympic Games
Bronze medal – third place	2016 Rio de Janeiro	Welterweight
World Amateur Championships
Gold medal – first place	2015 Doha	Welterweight
African Championships
Gold medal – first place	2015 Casablanca	Welterweight
Gold medal – first place	2023 Yaoundé	Welterweight

Mohammed Rabii (Arabic: محمد ربيعي Muḥammad Rabī‘ī; born 13 July 1993) is a Moroccan boxer. He won a bronze medal in the men's welterweight event at the 2016 Summer Olympics. In the same event in 2015, he won gold medals at the World Amateur Championships and the African Championships.

== Career ==
=== World Series of Boxing record ===
9 fights	8 wins	1 loss
By knockout	1	0
By decision	7	1

No.	Result	Record	Team	Opponent (Team)	Type	Round, time	Date	Location	Notes
9	Loss	8–1	Morocco Atlas Lions	(United States) Paul Kroll (USA Knockouts)	PTS	5	1 April 2016	Miami, United States	
8	Win	8–0	Morocco Atlas Lions	(United Kingdom) Ekow Essuman (British Lionhearts)	PTS	5	5 February 2016	Casablanca, Morocco	
7	Win	7–0	Morocco Atlas Lions	(Russia) Tamerlan Magomedov (Russian Boxing Team)	TKO	1 (5)	24 April 2015	Casablanca, Morocco	
6	Win	6–0	Morocco Atlas Lions	Liu Wei (China Dragons)	PTS	5	10 April 2015	Casablanca, Morocco	
5	Win	5–0	Morocco Atlas Lions	(United Kingdom) Ekow Essuman (British Lionhearts)	PTS	5	19 March 2015	London, United Kingdom	
4	Win	4–0	Morocco Atlas Lions	Roniel Iglesias (Cuba Domadores)	PTS	5	6 March 2015	Casablanca, Morocco	
3	Win	3–0	Morocco Atlas Lions	Sofiane Tabi (Algeria Desert Hawks)	PTS	5	20 February 2015	Casablanca, Morocco	
2	Win	2–0	Morocco Atlas Lions	Oleg Zubenko (Ukraine Otamans)	PTS	5	6 February 2015	Kyiv, Ukraine	
1	Win	1–0	Morocco Atlas Lions	Marvin Cabrera (Mexico Guerreros)	PTS	5	24 January 2015	Aguascalientes, Mexico	WSB debut

=== Professional career ===
He signed his contract with Nowhere2Hyde Management on 30 October 2016. His first match was really memorable for him on 11 March 2017 because while he was fighting with László Kovács in the Czech Republic, his wife was laboring with their son in Morocco.

==== Professional boxing record ====
10 fights	10 wins	0 losses
By knockout	5	0
By decision	5	0

No.	Result	Record	Opponent	Type	Round, time	Date	Location	Notes
10	Win	10-0	(Mexico) Jesus Gurrola	UD	8	16 November 2019	Halle Messe Arena, Sachsen-Anhalt Germany	
9	Win	9-0	(Poland) Rafał Jackiewicz	UD	8	2 March 2019	Maritim Hotel, Magdeburg Germany	
8	Win	8-0	(Kazakhstan) Alexandr Zhuravskiy	UD	8	8 December 2018	Palais des sports Marcel-Cerdan, Levallois-Perret, France	
7	Win	7-0	(Austria) Gojko Knezevic	TKO	1 (8)	20 October 2018	Palais des Sports, Marseille, France	
6	Win	6-0	(Brazil) Anderson Clayton	UD	8	15 September 2018	Stadthalle, Magdeburg, Germany	
5	Win	5-0	(Italy) Giuseppe Lauri	TKO	3 (8)	24 March 2018	Palais des Sports, Marseille, France	
4	Win	4-0	(Hungary) László Szilvai	KO	1 (6)	2 December 2017	La Palestre, Le Cannet, France	
3	Win	3-0	(Georgia (country)) Teimuraz Abuladze	KO	1 (6)	1 July 2017	Casino d'Evian, Évian-les-Bains, France	
2	Win	2-0	(Belgium) Jean-Pierre Habimana	PTS	6	22 April 2017	Messehalle, Erfurt, Germany	
1	Win	1-0	(Hungary) László Kovács	TKO	1 (6)	11 March 2017	Královka Arena, Prague, Czech Republic	Professional debut
