= 2011 ALBA Games =

IV ALBA Games
- Host city: Venezuela
- Nations: TBA
- Athletes: ~2,055
- Events: 23 in 35 sports
- Opening: 17 July 2011
- Closing: 30 July 2011
- Opened by: Hugo Chávez

The IV ALBA Games (Spanish: Juegos del ALBA Bicentenario) is a multi-sport event held between 17–30 July 2011 in ten different states of Venezuela. The games are organized by the Bolivarian Alliance for the Americas (ALBA).

== Participating nations ==
The following countries are expected to compete. The number of competitors qualified by each delegation is indicated in parentheses.

- Antigua and Barbuda
- Argentina
- Bolivia (157)
- Brazil
- Chile
- Colombia
- Cuba (368)
- Curaçao
- Dominica
- Dominican Republic
- Ecuador (126)
- El Salvador
- Guatemala
- Guyana
- Haiti
- Mexico
- Nicaragua (134)
- Paraguay
- Peru
- Puerto Rico
- Saint Vincent and the Grenadines
- Spain
- Trinidad and Tobago
- Venezuela (806)

== Sports ==
- Archery
- Athletics
- Badminton
- Basketball
- Baseball
- Basque Pelota
- Beach volleyball
- Boxing
- Canoeing
- Cycling
  - BMX racing
  - Mountain biking
  - Road cycling
  - Track cycling
- Diving
- Fencing
- Football
- Gymnastics
  - Artistic gymnastics
  - Rhythmic gymnastics
- Handball
- Judo
- Karate
- Racquetball
- Rowing
- Shooting
- Softball
- Speed skating
- Swimming
- Taekwondo
- Tennis
- Table tennis
- Triathlon
- Volleyball
- Water polo
- Weightlifting
- Wrestling

== Medal table ==
Host nation (Venezuela)

* Host nation (Venezuela)

Rank	Nation	Gold	Silver	Bronze	Total
1	Venezuela (VEN)*	112	142	103	357
2	Cuba (CUB)	92	47	41	180
3	Colombia (COL)	19	12	18	49
4	Ecuador (ECU)	13	22	34	69
5	Chile (CHL)	8	7	4	19
6	Bolivia (BOL)	5	11	20	36
7	Argentina (ARG)	4	1	9	14
8	Mexico (MEX)	2	1	1	4
9	Dominican Republic (DOM)	1	6	14	21
Totals (9 entries)		256	249	244	749
