= Carl Hield =

Bahamian boxer (born 1986)

Personal information
- Nicknames: Flashy King; King Flashy 242
- Nationality: Bahamian
- Born: Carl Leviticus Hield; 9 August 1986 (age 40) Nassau, The Bahamas
- Height: 174 cm (5 ft 8 1/2 in)
- Weight: Welterweight; Super welterweight; Middleweight

Boxing career
- Stance: Orthodox

Boxing record
- Total fights: 17
- Wins: 17
- Win by KO: 17
- Losses: 0

Carl Leviticus Hield (born 9 August 1986), nicknamed "Flashy King", is a Bahamian boxer. In an amateur career of twenty years he won a bronze medal at welterweight at the 2010 Commonwealth Games and a silver medal at the 2014 Central American and Caribbean Games, and boxed for The Bahamas at five Commonwealth Games, the 2015 Pan American Games and several editions of the World Championships. He turned professional in October 2023, aged 37, and has won all 17 of his professional bouts by knockout or technical knockout, holding regional titles of the World Boxing Association (WBA), the National Boxing Association (NBA) and the World Boxing Council (WBC). In 2026 he returned to the amateur ring for a sixth Commonwealth Games.

== Amateur career ==
Hield was born in Nassau and came through the Champion Amateur Boxing Club, the Nassau gym of the former professional Ray Minus Jr. He was a silver medallist in the 60 kg class at the 2003 Caribbean Cadet Championships in Nassau. At the 2006 Commonwealth Games in Melbourne he lost his opening bout at light welterweight to Jamie Crees of Wales, and in 2006 he was runner-up at welterweight at the Caribbean Championships in Trinidad. He was beaten in his first bout at the World Championships of 2007 and 2009.

From 2010 Hield boxed mainly at welterweight (69 kg). He reached the quarter-finals of the 2010 Central American and Caribbean Games (CAC Games) in Mayagüez in July, and at the Commonwealth Games in Delhi in October he stopped Hubert Lucien of Dominica and outpointed Farkhan Haron of Malaysia and Kennedy St-Pierre of Mauritius before losing 4–3 to England's Callum Smith in the semi-finals, which earned him a bronze medal.

He lost his opening bouts at the 2011 World Championships in Baku and at the Americas qualifying tournament for the 2012 Summer Olympics, where he was beaten by Prichard Colón of Puerto Rico. By 2013 he was the only elite senior boxer left in the Bahamian amateur programme, and he prepared abroad, at training camps run under an AIBA development programme and for long spells in Havana. At the 2013 World Championships in Almaty, his fourth, he outpointed Scotland's Lewis Benson before losing a 3–0 decision to the fourth seed, Daniyar Yeleussinov of Kazakhstan. He then joined the Mexico Guerreros franchise for the 2013–14 season of the World Series of Boxing, losing on points to Mahamed Nurudzinau of the Azerbaijan Baku Fires, and the Guerreros drafted him again for the following season.

At the 2014 Commonwealth Games in Glasgow he stopped Mbachi Kaonga of Zambia and then lost on points to Canada's Custio Clayton. In November he won the silver medal at welterweight at the CAC Games in Veracruz, beating Lester Martínez of Guatemala, John Sánchez of Colombia and Nicklaus Flaz of Puerto Rico before losing the final 3–0 to Cuba's Roniel Iglesias. It was the only medal won by the three-man Bahamian boxing team.

A bronze medal at the qualifying tournament in Tijuana took him to the 2015 Pan American Games in Toronto, where he lost his quarter-final 3–0 to Alberto Palmetta of Argentina. He moved up to middleweight for the 2016 Olympic qualifiers and lost his first bout at both the Americas tournament in Buenos Aires, to Canada's Clovis Drolet, and the world tournament in Baku.

Back at welterweight, Hield lost his opening bout at the 2017 continental championships in Tegucigalpa. In March 2018, after the Bahamas Amateur Boxing Federation said that it had no money to send boxers to the CAC Games qualifier in Tijuana, he travelled alone, paying for the trip with his government athlete's subvention and a sponsorship from his sister. He qualified by beating Jamaica's Joshua Frazer and then retired with an elbow injury against Iglesias. At the 2018 Commonwealth Games on the Gold Coast the following month he lost a 5–0 decision to the Australian Terry Nickolas in the round of 32.

Hield did not qualify for the 2020 Summer Olympics.

The Bahamas Boxing Federation nominated Hield for the 2023 Pan American Games in Santiago, but the Bahamas Olympic Committee did not select him. According to the federation's president, Vincent Strachan, the committee cited Hield's age and recent results. Strachan criticised the decision, but the committee's president declined to comment. Hield turned professional the same month.

== Professional career ==
Hield made his professional debut on 21 October 2023 in Cartagena, Colombia, stopping Elkin Bolaño in the second round of a super-welterweight bout. All but two of his professional bouts have taken place in Colombia. By March 2024 he had won each of his first six professional bouts by knockout or technical knockout. With professionals admitted to Olympic qualifying, he also entered the second world qualification tournament for the 2024 Summer Olympics, in Bangkok, where he lost a unanimous decision to Israel's Miroslav Kapuler.

On 28 February 2026 Hield won the vacant WBC FECARBOX middleweight title with a third-round knockout in Colombia and a win in Santa Marta in May took his record to 16–0.

Hield went back to amateur competition for the 2026 Commonwealth Games in Glasgow. In the 70 kg class he beat Oswald Talaka of the Solomon Islands 3–1 in the round of 16 on 27 July, but he sprained an ankle during the bout and withdrew from his quarter-final against Northern Ireland's Jon McConnell. After the Games he went back to professional boxing and on 15 August 2026 won a bout in Santa Marta by a third-round knockout, which took his record to 17–0.

In October 2024, after being dropped from the government's subvention programme for elite athletes, Hield asked the Ministry of Youth, Sports and Culture to review his case. For 2026–27 he was placed in the programme's lowest tier, worth $14,000 a year, and in September 2026 he asked to be reclassified on the strength of his professional record.

== Personal life ==
Hield is married to Irina Chacón Palacios, a Cuban former karate competitor and coach who works with him in training, and has two daughters, Carlina and Carolina.

He coaches young athletes at a park in his neighbourhood.
