= Lewis Benson (boxer) =

Scottish boxer

Personal information
- Nickname: Kid Caramel
- Nationality: Scottish
- Born: 2 December 1991 (age 34) Edinburgh, Scotland
- Height: 1.78 m (5 ft 10 in)

Boxing career
- Stance: Orthodox

Boxing record
- Total fights: 14
- Wins: 12
- Win by KO: 2
- Losses: 2
Medal record
Men's amateur boxing
Representing Scotland
GB Championships
Gold medal – first place	2012 London	Light welterweight

Lewis Benson (born 2 December 1991) is a Scottish former professional boxer who competed from 2015 to 2019.

As an amateur, Benson won four consecutive Scottish national titles from 2012 to 2015. He competed at the 2013 World Championships and the 2014 Commonwealth Games, both at welterweight, and won gold at the 2012 Great Britain Championships as a light welterweight. Benson subsequently made his professional debut in September 2015, winning ten straight fights before dropping two in a row via points decision in 2018. Increasingly disillusioned with boxing, he retired from the sport the following year after the British Boxing Board of Control pulled him from The Golden Contract tournament.

== Early life ==
Benson was born on 2 December 1991 in Edinburgh to a Nigerian father and a Scottish mother. Due to the colour of his skin, he was socially outcast and often found himself as the victim of racial profiling. In one incident at age eleven, he glanced at someone's car in a driveway and was accused of looking like he wanted to break into it. As the only mixed-race child at his primary school, Benson suffered racist abuse and often got into trouble for fighting back. He took a liking to boxing, but his mother asked that he improve his behaviour in school before he began practicing the sport. "Ever since then, I got my head down," he said. He credits boxing with changing his life around by giving him the opportunity to do something positive.

== Amateur career ==
Benson joined the Meadowbank Amateur Boxing Club in east Edinburgh at age 13 and started taking classes under former Scottish super featherweight champion Mark Geragthy. Under Geragthy's guidance, he became a Scottish youth national champion and medalled at two separate British Youth Championships. Benson made the move to Lochend Amateur Boxing Club in 2010. He was a four-time Scottish national champion at Lochend, winning consecutive titles from 2012 to 2015. He also won a gold medal at the 2012 Great Britain Championships in London.

In December 2012, Benson left his electrician apprenticeship to focus on qualifying for the 2014 Commonwealth Games. After winning his second straight national title at light welterweight in early 2013, he moved up one weight class to compete at that year's World Championships in Kazakhstan, where he suffered an early exit at the hands of Bahamian fighter Carl Hield in the preliminary round. At the 2014 National Championships, Benson defeated Connor Law in the finals, then beat Law again just a few weeks later in a box-off to determine who would represent Scotland at the 2014 Commonwealth Games held in Glasgow. Even though Benson was the national champion, the fight was necessary because Law had accumulated more points during the qualification period. However, at the Games, Benson lost to Bowyn Morgan of New Zealand in his opening bout. He won one last national title in 2015 after moving back down to light welterweight, defeating longtime friend Jason Easton in the final.

== Professional career ==
Benson signed with MTK Scotland, a subsidiary of MTK Global, in the summer of 2015. He made his professional debut that September, defeating Kristian Laight on points at the Meadowbank Sports Centre in Edinburgh. Shortly after his eighth fight, a victory over Marek Laskowski in March 2017, he suffered a back injury in sparring that hospitalized him and left him sidelined for seven months. After ten straight wins to begin his pro career, Benson suffered his first defeat on 30 June 2018, falling to former Prizefighter: The Welterweights winner Johnny Coyle via a 96–95 points decision in Belfast. He lost again in his next bout five months later, dropping a controversial points decision against Tyrone McKenna in Glasgow by the same 96–95 score. Immediately following the loss, he announced he was quitting the sport during the live television interview on BoxNation. "I don’t want to have to build up for fights with no money in it. I’ve got my health to think about. I’d much rather have a healthier lifestyle and not get punched for a living, particularly when you get decisions like that," he told the Edinburgh Evening News a few days later.

Benson made his return to the ring on 22 March 2019 with a comfortable victory over Zoltán Szabó in Glasgow, then improved to a 12–2 record with a close win over Renald Garrido. That October, he was announced as a participant in The Golden Contract super-lightweight tournament that secures the winner a two-year, five-fight contract with MTK Global. Initially listed as a reserve, Benson was awarded his spot in the tournament following the withdrawal of Akeem Ennis-Brown. However, he was pulled from the event one day before his first fight by the British Boxing Board of Control, who refused to allow him to compete for medical reasons. After describing it as "the worst day of his life," he effectively retired, saying "I won’t get an opportunity like this again so I’m going to call it a day in this boxing game. I’m devastated I can’t box as I am on weight and ready to fight. There are no words to describe how heartbroken I am."

== Professional boxing record ==
Data retrieved from BoxRec.

14 fights	12 wins	2 losses
By knockout	2	0
By decision	10	2

No.	Result	Record	Opponent	Type	Round, time	Date	Location
14	Win	12–2	(France) Renald Garrido	PTS	8	22 Jun 2019	(United Kingdom) Emirates Arena, Glasgow, Scotland
13	Win	11–2	(Hungary) Zoltán Szabó	PTS	6	22 Mar 2019	(United Kingdom) Emirates Arena, Glasgow, Scotland
12	Loss	10–2	(United Kingdom) Tyrone McKenna	PTS	10	30 Nov 2018	(United Kingdom) Emirates Arena, Glasgow, Scotland
11	Loss	10–1	(United Kingdom) Johnny Coyle	PTS	10	30 Jun 2018	(United Kingdom) SSE Arena, Belfast, Northern Ireland
10	Win	10–0	(Nicaragua) Michael Isaac Carrero	PTS	4	16 Dec 2017	(United Kingdom) Lagoon Leisure Centre, Paisley, Scotland
9	Win	9–0	(Russia) Mikhail Avakian	PTS	6	6 Oct 2017	(United Kingdom) Meadowbank Sports Centre, Edinburgh, Scotland
8	Win	8–0	(Poland) Marek Laskowski	PTS	6	11 Mar 2017	(United Kingdom) Meadowbank Sports Centre, Edinburgh, Scotland
7	Win	7–0	(Poland) Łukasz Janik	PTS	6	1 Oct 2016	(United Kingdom) Bellahouston Leisure Centre, Glasgow, Scotland
6	Win	6–0	(United Kingdom) Fonz Alexander	PTS	4	7 May 2016	(United Kingdom) Meadowbank Sports Centre, Edinburgh, Scotland
5	Win	5–0	(Lithuania) Edvinas Puplauskas	PTS	4	21 Apr 2016	(United Kingdom) Crowne Plaza Hotel, Glasgow, Scotland
4	Win	4–0	(Bulgaria) Radoslav Mitev	RTD	1 (4), 3:00	12 Mar 2016	(United Kingdom) Meadowbank Sports Centre, Edinburgh, Scotland
3	Win	3–0	(United Kingdom) Matt Seawright	KO	1 (6), 1:31	5 Dec 2015	(United Kingdom) Meadowbank Sports Centre, Edinburgh, Scotland
2	Win	2–0	(Nicaragua) Santos Medrano	PTS	4	29 Oct 2015	(United Kingdom) Crowne Plaza Hotel, Glasgow, Scotland
1	Win	1–0	(United Kingdom) Kristian Laight	PTS	4	5 Sep 2015	(United Kingdom) Meadowbank Sports Centre, Edinburgh, Scotland
