= Liu Wei (boxer) =

Chinese boxer (born 1987)

Personal information
- Nationality: Chinese
- Born: 27 November 1987 (age 37); Shandong, China

Sport
- Sport: Boxing

Liu Wei (Chinese: 刘伟; pinyin: Liú Wěi, born 27 November 1987) is a Chinese boxer. He competed in the men's welterweight event at the 2016 Summer Olympics.
