= Arajik Marutjan =

German boxer (born 1992)

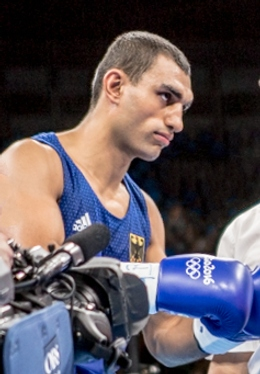
- Marutjan at the 2016 Olympics

Personal information
- Born: 15 August 1992 (age 33) Armavir, Armenia
- Height: 180 cm (5 ft 11 in)
- Weight: 69 kg (152 lb)

Sport
- Country: Germany
- Sport: Amateur boxing
- Club: BC Traktor Schwerin
- Coached by: Michael Timm
Medal record
World Championships
Bronze medal – third place	2013 Almaty	Welterweight
European Amateur Championships
Silver medal – second place	2013 Minsk	Welterweight

Arajik Marutjan (born 15 August 1992) is an amateur welterweight boxer who represents Germany. In 2013, he won a bronze medal at the world championships and a silver at the European championships. He was eliminated in the first bout at the 2016 Olympics.
