= Arisnoidys Despaigne =

Cuban boxer

Medal record

Representing Cuba

Men's Amateur boxing

World Championships
Silver medal – second place	2013 Almaty	Welterweight

Arisnoidys Despaigne is a Cuban boxer who competes in the welterweight division. In the 2013 AIBA World Boxing Championships he reached the finals.
