= Mandeep Jangra =

Indian boxer (born 1993)

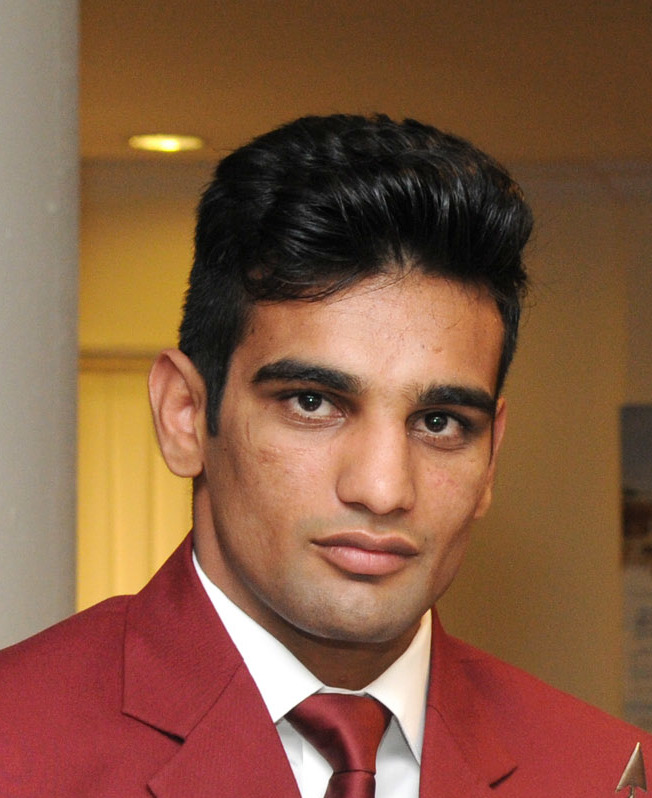

Personal information
- Nickname: Kartoos
- Nationality: Indian
- Born: Mandeep Jangra; 19 May 1993 (age 33) Kharian, Haryana, India
- Height: 5 ft 10 in (178 cm)
- Weight: Lightweight

Boxing career
- Reach: 70 in (178 cm)
- Stance: Orthodox

Boxing record
- Total fights: 13
- Wins: 12
- Win by KO: 7
- Losses: 1
Medal record
Asian Championships
Silver medal – second place	2013 Amman	Welterweight
Commonwealth Games
Silver medal – second place	2014 Glasgow	Welterweight

Mandeep Jangra (born 19 May 1993) is former Indian amateur boxer and current professional. He won the silver medal at the 2013 Asian Amateur Boxing Championships in the welterweight category. He represented India at the 2014 Commonwealth Games in Glasgow in the same category and won the silver medal. He was awarded the prestigious Arjuna Award in 2015. In November 2024, Won the World Boxing Federation's super featherweight world title after defeating Britain's Conor McIntosh in the Cayman Islands.

Jangra is coached by Indian boxer Akhil Kumar and supported by Anglian Medal Hunt Company. After his third professional bout he was signed to be coached by Roy Jones Jr.

Mandeep Jangra has achieved a few major achievements other than Arjuna Award & Silver at the Glasgow Commonwealth games. Notable results include a silver medal at the 2013 Asian Amateur Boxing Championships and a gold medal at the 2016 South Asian Games.

== Professional career ==
Jangra made his professional debut on 7 May 2021, winning a four-round unanimous decision over Argentina's Luciano Ramos at the Osceola Heritage Park in Kissimmee.

== Professional boxing record ==
13 fights	12 wins	1 loss
By knockout	7	0
By decision	5	1

No.	Result	Record	Opponent	Type	Round, time	Date	Location	Notes
13	Win	13–1	(United Kingdom) Marley Mason	UD	10	04 Apr 2025	Stamford Bridge, Chelsea, London, United Kingdom	
12	Win	12–1	(United Kingdom) Conor McIntosh	UD	12	24 Nov 2024	Lions Centre, George Town, Caymen Islands, British Overseas Territory, United Kingdom	Won the World Boxing Federation's super featherweight world title.
11	Loss	10–1	(Nicaragua) Nilo Guerrero	MD	10	19 Sep 2024	(United States) Yakama Legends Casino, Toppenish, Washington, USA	
10	Win	10–0	(Colombia) Jose Camacho	KO	1(8), 1:37	24 May 2024	Round A Round Fitness Club, Santa Marta, Colombia	
9	Win	9–0	(Colombia) Argel Berrio	RTD	5(10)	14 May 2024	Coliseo Menor De Villa Olimpica, Santa Marta, Colombia	
8	Win	8–0	(Colombia) Reynaldo Esquivia	TKO	4(8), 1:15	5 May 2024	Gimnasio Yorby Mendoza, Cartagena, Colombia	
7	Win	7–0	(United States) Gerardo Esquivel	UD	10	25 Jan 2024	(United States) Yakama Legends Casino, Toppenish, Washington, USA	
6	Win	6–0	(United States) Markus Bowes	TKO	4(6), 2:41	23 Aug 2023	(United States) Whitesands Events Center, Plant City, Florida, USA	
5	Win	5–0	(Nicaragua) Yesner Talavera	UD	6	26 Jul 2023	(United States) Kissimmee Civic Center, Kissimmee, Florida, USA	
4	Win	4–0	(United States) Ryan Reber	RTD	2 (4), 3:00	1 Apr 2023	(United States) Fiserv Forum, Milwaukee, Wisconsin, USA	
3	Win	3–0	(Mexico) Brandon Sandoval	TKO	3 (4), 2:59	25 Mar 2022	(United States) Whitesands Events Center, Plant City, Florida, USA	
2	Win	2–0	(United States) Devon Lira	TKO	2 (4), 2:44	7 Aug 2021	(United States) Whitesands Events Center, Plant City, Florida, USA	
1	Win	1–0	(Argentina) Luciano Ramos	UD	4	7 May 2021	(United States) Osceola Heritage Park, Kissimmee, Florida, USA	
