= Parviz Baghirov =

Azerbaijani boxer (born 1994)

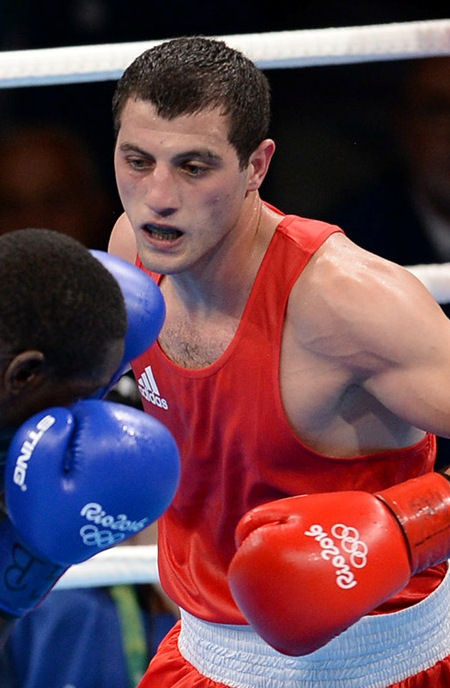
- Baghirov at the 2016 Summer Olympics

Personal information
- Full name: Parviz Fizuli oglu Baghirov
- Nationality: Azerbaijani
- Born: 10 February 1994 (age 32) Baku, Azerbaijan
- Height: 1.77 m (5 ft 10 in)
- Weight: 69 kg (152 lb)

Sport
- Sport: Boxing
- Weight class: Welterweight
Medal record
Men's amateur boxing
Representing Azerbaijan
World Amateur Championships
Bronze medal – third place	2015 Doha	Welterweight
European Games
Gold medal – first place	2015 Baku	Welterweight

Parviz Baghirov (born 10 February 1994) is an Azerbaijani boxer. He competed in the men's welterweight event at the 2016 Summer Olympics. He won the gold medal at the 2015 European Games and a bronze medal at the 2015 World Boxing Championships.
