= 2016 AIBA World Olympic Qualifying Tournament =

Boxing competitions

- Venue: Sarhadchi Multi-Purpose Arena
- Location: Baku, Azerbaijan
- Start date: June 16, 2016
- End date: June 25, 2016

The 2016 AIBA World Olympic Qualification Tournament for the boxing tournament at the 2016 Summer Olympics in Rio de Janeiro, Brazil, was held between June 16 and June 25, 2016 in Baku, Azerbaijan.

== Medal table ==
Rank	NOC	Gold	Silver	Bronze	Total
1	Azerbaijan	2	0	0	2
2	Ireland	1	1	0	2
3	Great Britain	1	0	1	2
3	Netherlands	1	0	1	2
5	Bulgaria	1	0	0	1
5	France	1	0	0	1
5	Italy	1	0	0	1
5	Poland	1	0	0	1
5	Ukraine	1	0	0	1
10	United States	0	1	2	3
11	Mongolia	0	1	1	2
12	Ecuador	0	1	0	1
12	Germany	0	1	0	1
12	Haiti	0	1	0	1
12	Hungary	0	1	0	1
12	Spain	0	1	0	1
12	Tajikistan	0	1	0	1
12	Turkmenistan	0	1	0	1
19	India	0	0	3	3
20	Belarus	0	0	2	2
21	China	0	0	1	1
21	Chinese Taipei	0	0	1	1
21	Cuba	0	0	1	1
21	Iraq	0	0	1	1
21	Japan	0	0	1	1
21	Mexico	0	0	1	1
21	Moldova	0	0	1	1
21	Morocco	0	0	1	1
21	Russia	0	0	1	1
21	Turkey	0	0	1	1
Total		10	10	20	40

== Qualified boxers ==
Event	Gold	Silver	Bronze	Bronze	Quarterfinal loser to event champion
Light flyweight (49 kg)	Rufat Huseynov (AZE)	Samuel Carmona (ESP)	Devendro Singh (IND)	Joselito Velázquez (MEX)	---
Flyweight (52 kg)	Daniel Asenov (BUL)	Antonio Vargas (USA)	Selçuk Eker (TUR)	Kharkhüügiin Enkh-Amar (MGL)	Elie Konki (FRA)
Bantamweight (56 kg)	Mykola Butsenko (UKR)	Erdenebatyn Tsendbaatar (MGL)	Robeisy Ramírez (CUB)	Arashi Morisaka (JPN)	Fahem Hammachi (ALG)
Lightweight (60 kg)	Enrico Lacruz (NED)	Anvar Yunusov (TJK)	Shan Jun (CHN)	Lai Chu-en (TPE)	Hakan Erşeker (QAT)
Light welterweight (64 kg)	Pat McCormack (GBR)	Richardson Hitchins (HAI)	Gary Antuanne Russell (USA)	Manoj Kumar (IND)	Hassan Amzile (FRA)
Welterweight (69 kg)	Souleymane Cissokho (FRA)	Imre Bacskai (HUN)	Pavel Kastramin (BLR)	Josh Kelly (GBR)	Simeon Chamov (BUL)
Middleweight (75 kg)	Michael O'Reilly (IRL)	Arslanbek Achilov (TKM)	Waheed Abdul-Ridha (IRQ)	Vikas Krishan Yadav (IND)	Kamran Shakhsuvarly (AZE)
Light heavyweight (81 kg)	Teymur Mammadov (AZE)	Serge Michel (GER)	Petr Khamukov (RUS)	Mikhail Dauhaliavets (BLR)	Hassan Saada (MAR)
Heavyweight (91 kg)	Igor Jakubowski (POL)	Julio Cesar Castillo (ECU)	Abdeljalil Abouhamda (MAR)	Roy Korving (NED)	---
Super heavyweight (+91 kg)	Guido Vianello (ITA)	Dean Gardiner (IRL)	Alexei Zavatin (MDA)	Marlo Moore (USA)	---

Boxer qualified for the 2016 Summer Olympics

== Summary ==
NOC	49	52	56	60	64	69	75	81	91	+91	Total
Algeria			X								1
Azerbaijan	X						X	X			3
Belarus						X		X			2
Bulgaria		X				X					2
China				X							1
Chinese Taipei				X							1
Cuba			X								1
France		X			X	X					3
Germany								X			1
Great Britain					X	X					2
Haiti					X						1
Hungary						X					1
India					X		X				2
Iraq							X				1
Ireland							X				1
Italy										X	1
Japan			X								1
Mongolia		X	X								2
Morocco								X			1
Netherlands				X							1
Poland									X		1
Qatar				X							1
Russia								X			1
Spain	X										1
Tajikistan				X							1
Turkey		X									1
Turkmenistan							X				1
Ukraine			X								1
United States		X			X						2
Total: 29 NOCs	2	5	5	5	5	5	5	5	1	1	39

== Results ==
=== Light flyweight (49 kg) ===
The top two boxers will qualify for the 2016 Summer Olympics.

Round of 32
	Score	
Josh English (AUS)	0–3	Yankiel Rivera (PUR)
Daniil Platonovschi (MDA)	3–0	Sibusiso Bandla (RSA)
Leandro Blanc (ARG)	2–1	Tinko Banabakov (BUL)
Tu Po-wei (TPE)	3–0	Víctor Santillan (DOM)
Kaeo Pongprayoon (THA)	3–0	Hasan Ali Shakir Al-Kaabi (IRQ)
Christos Cherakis (GER)	0–3	Billal Bennama (FRA)

Round of 16
Dmytro Zamotaev (UKR)	3
Yankiel Rivera (PUR)	0
Samuel Carmona (ESP)	3
Turat Osmonov (KGZ)	0
Lee Ye-chan (KOR)	0
Sibusiso Bandla (RSA)	3
Leandro Blanc (ARG)	0
Devendro Singh (IND)	3
Rufat Huseynov (AZE)	3
Tu Po-wei (TPE)	0
Kaeo Pongprayoon (THA)	0
Zouhir El-Bekkali (MAR)	3
Tosho Kashiwasaki (JPN)	0
Carlos Quipo (ECU)	3
Billal Bennama (FRA)	0
Joselito Velázquez (MEX)	3

Quarterfinals
Dmytro Zamotaev (UKR)	0
Samuel Carmona (ESP)	3
Sibusiso Bandla (RSA)	0
Devendro Singh (IND)	3
Rufat Huseynov (AZE)	3
Zouhir El-Bekkali (MAR)	0
Carlos Quipo (ECU)	0
Joselito Velázquez (MEX)	3

Semifinals
Samuel Carmona (ESP)	3
Devendro Singh (IND)	0
Rufat Huseynov (AZE)	3
Joselito Velázquez (MEX)	0

Final
Samuel Carmona (ESP)
Rufat Huseynov (AZE)	WO

=== Flyweight (52 kg) ===
The top four semifinalists and the quarterfinalist who lost to the eventual champion will qualify for the 2016 Summer Olympics.

Round of 64
	Score	
Viliam Tankó (SVK)	3–0	Aref Nazari Mohammad (AFG)
Maciej Jóźwik (POL)	0–3	Alexandr Riscan (MDA)
Ian Clark Bautista (PHI)	0-3	José Kelvin de la Nieve (ESP)
Antonio Vargas (USA)	3–0	Gaurav Bidhuri (IND)
Kirill Serikov (EST)	0–3	Fayzen Rakhmatshoev (TJK)
Kim In-kyu (KOR)	2–1	Hamza Touba (GER)

Section A

Round of 32
Ceiber Avila Segura (COL)	3
Viliam Tankó (SVK)	0
Sajjad Mohammadpour (IRI)	3
Simon Nzioki (KEN)	0
Selçuk Eker (TUR)	3
Alex Winwood (AUS)	0
Dodji Ayigah (BEL)	3
Thomas Blumenfeld (CAN)	0
Elie Konki (FRA)	2
Alexandr Riscan (MDA)	1
Nándor Csóka (HUN)	0
Ryomei Tanaka (JPN)	3
David Alaverdov (ISR)	0
Azat Usenaliev (KGZ)	3
José Kelvin de la Nieve (ESP)	0
Daniel Asenov (BUL)	3

Round of 16
Ceiber Avila Segura (COL)	3
Sajjad Mohammadpour (IRI)	0
Selçuk Eker (TUR)	3
Dodji Ayigah (BEL)	0
Elie Konki (FRA)	2
Ryomei Tanaka (JPN)	1
Azat Usenaliev (KGZ)	0
Daniel Asenov (BUL)	3

Quarterfinals
Ceiber Avila Segura (COL)	1
Selçuk Eker (TUR)	2
Elie Konki (FRA)	0
Daniel Asenov (BUL)	3

Semifinals
Selçuk Eker (TUR)
Daniel Asenov (BUL)	TKO

Section B

Round of 32
Yoel Finol Rivas (VEN)	0
Antonio Vargas (USA)	3
Eddie Valenzuela (GUA)	2
Sikho Nqothole (RSA)	1
Vincenzo Picardi (ITA)	3
Ihor Sopinskyi (UKR)	0
Fayzen Rakhmatshoev (TJK)	3
Abel Kebede Tufa (ETH)	0
Tanes Ongjunta (THA)	3
Asif Syed Muhammad (PAK)	0
Zarip Jumayev (TKM)	0
Murtadha Al-Sudani (IRQ)	3
Montassar El-Bouali (TUN)	1
Kharkhüügiin Enkh-Amar (MGL)	2
Kim In-kyu (KOR)	0
David Jimenez (CRC)	3

Round of 16
Antonio Vargas (USA)	3
Eddie Valenzuela (GUA)	0
Vincenzo Picardi (ITA)	3
Fayzen Rakhmatshoev (TJK)	0
Tanes Ongjunta (THA)	3
Murtadha Al-Sudani (IRQ)	0
Kharkhüügiin Enkh-Amar (MGL)	2
David Jimenez (CRC)	0

Quarterfinals
Antonio Vargas (USA)	3
Vincenzo Picardi (ITA)	0
Tanes Ongjunta (THA)	0
Kharkhüügiin Enkh-Amar (MGL)	3

Semifinals
Antonio Vargas (USA)	TKO
Kharkhüügiin Enkh-Amar (MGL)

Final

Final
1	Daniel Asenov (BUL)	3
2	Antonio Vargas (USA)	0

=== Bantamweight (56 kg) ===
The top four semifinalists and the quarterfinalist who lost to the eventual champion will qualify for the 2016 Summer Olympics.

Round of 64
	Score	
Jaafar Abdul-Ridha (IRQ)	3–0	Merab Turkadze (GEO)
Ehsan Sepahvandi (IRI)	3–0	Adrian Kowal (POL)
Bakhodur Usmonov (TJK)	0–3	Frederik Lundgaard Jensen (DEN)
Robeisy Ramírez (CUB)	3–0	Arslan Khataev (FIN)
Emmanuel Ngoma (ZAM)	2–1	Krenar Zeneli (ALB)
Zweli Comfort Dlamini (SWZ)	TKO	Veaceslav Gojan (MDA)
Erdenebatyn Tsendbaatar (MGL)	3–0	Riccardo D'Andrea (ITA)
Edgar Walth (GER)	3–0	Ayabonga Sonjica (RSA)
Jose Caraballo (PUR)	3–0	Naimatullah (PAK)

Section A

Round of 32
Mykola Butsenko (UKR)	KO
Jaafar Abdul-Ridha (IRQ)
Vladislav Voroshilov (ISR)	3
Nadim Sadiqi (AFG)	0
Fahem Hammachi (ALG)	WO
Ehsan Sepahvandi (IRI)
Frederik Lundgaard Jensen (DEN)	3
Nicolae Andreiana (ROU)	0
Omurbek Malabekov (KGZ)	0
Robeisy Ramírez (CUB)	3
Lin Sheng-ling (TPE)	0
Mohammad Al-Wadi (JOR)	3
Segundo Padilla (ECU)	3
José Vicente Diaz (VEN)	0
Emmanuel Ngoma (ZAM)	0
Benson Gicharu (KEN)	3

Round of 16
Mykola Butsenko (UKR)	3
Vladislav Voroshilov (ISR)	0
Fahem Hammachi (ALG)	3
Frederik Lundgaard Jensen (DEN)	0
Robeisy Ramírez (CUB)	3
Mohammad Al-Wadi (JOR)	0
Segundo Padilla (ECU)	0
Benson Gicharu (KEN)	3

Quarterfinals
Mykola Butsenko (UKR)	2
Fahem Hammachi (ALG)	0
Robeisy Ramírez (CUB)	3
Benson Gicharu (KEN)	0

Semifinals
Mykola Butsenko (UKR)	3
Robeisy Ramírez (CUB)	0

Section B

Round of 32
Ham Sang-myeong (KOR)	3
Veaceslav Gojan (MDA)	0
Sándor Tar (HUN)	DSQ
Juan Reyes Donis (GUA)
Michal Takács (SVK)	0
Ibrahim Gökçek (TUR)	3
Erdenebatyn Tsendbaatar (MGL)	3
Ivan Delgado (MEX)	0
Hesham Abdelaal (EGY)	0
Edgar Walth (GER)	3
Stefan Ivanov (BUL)	3
Anthony Shawn Joseph (TTO)	0
Yakub Meredov (TKM)	0
Arashi Morisaka (JPN)	3
Jose Caraballo (PUR)	3
Héctor García (DOM)	0

Round of 16
Ham Sang-myeong (KOR)	0
Juan Reyes Donis (GUA)	3
Ibrahim Gökçek (TUR)	0
Erdenebatyn Tsendbaatar (MGL)	3
Edgar Walth (GER)	2
Stefan Ivanov (BUL)	1
Arashi Morisaka (JPN)	3
Jose Caraballo (PUR)	0

Quarterfinals
Juan Reyes Donis (GUA)	0
Erdenebatyn Tsendbaatar (MGL)	3
Edgar Walth (GER)	0
Arashi Morisaka (JPN)	3

Semifinals
Erdenebatyn Tsendbaatar (MGL)	2
Arashi Morisaka (JPN)	1

Final

Final
1	Mykola Butsenko (UKR)	TKO
2	Erdenebatyn Tsendbaatar (MGL)

=== Lightweight (60 kg) ===
The top four semifinalists and the quarterfinalist who lost to the eventual champion will qualify for the 2016 Summer Olympics.

Round of 64
	Score	
Kevin Alfonso Luna (GUA)	0–3	Dheeraj Rangi (IND)
Michael Alexander (TTO)	3–0	Elian Dimitrov (BUL)
Shan Jun (CHN)	3–0	Igor Lazarev (ISR)
Violant Sylejmani (KOS)	3–0	Taulant Zajmi (ALB)
Harry Garside (AUS)	3–0	Kastriot Sopa (GER)
Edgaras Skurdelis (LTU)	0–3	Anvar Yunusov (TJK)
Akzhol Sulaimanbek Uulu (KGZ)	0–3	Miklós Varga (HUN)
Pachanya Longchin (THA)	3–0	David Gauthier (CAN)
Hursand Imankuliýew (TKM)	3–0	Asanda Gingqi (RSA)
Pedro Manuel Gomes (ANG)	3–0	Mateusz Polski (POL)
Alaa Shili (TUN)	0–3	Foroutan Golara (IRI)
Hamza Rabii (MAR)	2–1	Dzmitry Sapon (BLR)
Rudolph Regis (BAH)	0–3	Lai Chu-en (TPE)

Section A

Round of 32
Lindolfo Delgado (MEX)	2
Dheeraj Rangi (IND)	1
Yohannes Berhane (SWE)	3
Ammar Jabbar (IRQ)	0
Dorin Bucșa (MDA)	0
Michael Alexander (TTO)	3
Shan Jun (CHN)	3
Stipan Prtenjača (CRO)	0
Volkan Gökçek (TUR)	3
Violant Sylejmani (KOS)	0
Harry Garside (AUS)	3
Choi Hae-ju (KOR)	0
Ahmad Ali (PAK)	0
Anvar Yunusov (TJK)	3
Miklós Varga (HUN)	1
Domenico Valentino (ITA)	2

Round of 16
Lindolfo Delgado (MEX)	0
Yohannes Berhane (SWE)	2
Michael Alexander (TTO)	0
Shan Jun (CHN)	2
Volkan Gökçek (TUR)	3
Harry Garside (AUS)	0
Anvar Yunusov (TJK)	3
Domenico Valentino (ITA)	0

Quarterfinals
Yohannes Berhane (SWE)	0
Shan Jun (CHN)	3
Volkan Gökçek (TUR)	0
Anvar Yunusov (TJK)	3

Semifinals
Shan Jun (CHN)	0
Anvar Yunusov (TJK)	3

Section B

Round of 32
Hakan Erşeker (QAT)	3
Pachanya Longchin (THA)	0
Otar Eranosyan (GEO)	3
Chad Milnes (NZL)	0
Bernard Torres (NOR)	0
Hursand Imankuliýew (TKM)	3
Pedro Manuel Gomes (ANG)
Enrico Lacruz (NED)	TKO
Elvis Rodriguez (DOM)	3
Foroutan Golara (IRI)	0
Hamza Rabii (MAR)	3
Tymur Beliak (UKR)	0
Artjom Ramlavs (LAT)	3
Nick Okoth (KEN)	0
Lai Chu-en (TPE)	3
José Javier Rosario (PUR)	0

Round of 16
Hakan Erşeker (QAT)	2
Otar Eranosyan (GEO)	0
Hursand Imankuliýew (TKM)	0
Enrico Lacruz (NED)	2
Elvis Rodriguez (DOM)	3
Hamza Rabii (MAR)	0
Artjom Ramlavs (LAT)	0
Lai Chu-en (TPE)	3

Quarterfinals
Hakan Erşeker (QAT)	0
Enrico Lacruz (NED)	3
Elvis Rodriguez (DOM)	0
Lai Chu-en (TPE)	3

Semifinals
Enrico Lacruz (NED)	3
Lai Chu-en (TPE)	0

Final

Final
1	Anvar Yunusov (TJK)	0
2	Enrico Lacruz (NED)	3

=== Light welterweight (64 kg) ===
The top four semifinalists and the quarterfinalist who lost to the eventual champion will qualify for the 2016 Summer Olympics.

Round of 64
	Score	
Hadi Makouei (IRI)	0–3	Richardson Hitchins (HAI)
Pan Hung-ming (TPE)	0–2	Maksim Vislaukh (BLR)
Gary Antuanne Russell (USA)	3–0	Viktor Petrov (UKR)
Daniel Tobar (GUA)	0–3	Obada Al-Kasbeh (JOR)
Lasha Guruli (GEO)	3–0	Eduardo Sánchez (CRC)
Ermek Sakenov (KGZ)	3–0	Masatsugu Kawachi (JPN)
Sbusiso Malinga (RSA)	0–3	Enock Mwandila Poulsen (DEN)
Danielito Zorrilla (PUR)	1–2	Manoj Kumar (IND)

Section A

Round of 32
Lim Hyun-chul (KOR)	0
Richardson Hitchins (HAI)	3
Jean Paul Cooper (TTO)	0
Johann Orozco (ESP)	3
Dimitri Galagot (MDA)	2
Hadi Hassan Srour (NOR)	1
Maksim Vislaukh (BLR)	0
Alexandros Tsanikidis (GRE)	3
Girmachew Tadesse (ETH)
Gary Antuanne Russell (USA)	TKO
David Biddle (AUS)	3
Richie Hadlow (NZL)	0
Ahmed Mejri (TUN)	3
Artūrs Ahmetovs (LAT)	0
Obada Al-Kasbeh (JOR)	3
Aziz Bebitov (TKM)	0

Round of 16
Richardson Hitchins (HAI)	2
Johann Orozco (ESP)	1
Dimitri Galagot (MDA)	0
Alexandros Tsanikidis (GRE)	3
Gary Antuanne Russell (USA)	3
David Biddle (AUS)	0
Ahmed Mejri (TUN)	0
Obada Al-Kasbeh (JOR)	3

Quarterfinals
Richardson Hitchins (HAI)	3
Alexandros Tsanikidis (GRE)	0
Gary Antuanne Russell (USA)	3
Obada Al-Kasbeh (JOR)	0

Semifinals
Richardson Hitchins (HAI)	WO
Gary Antuanne Russell (USA)

Section B

Round of 32
Edin Sejdinovič (SLO)	0
Lasha Guruli (GEO)	3
Pat McCormack (GBR)	3
Thulasi Tharumalingam (QAT)	0
Hassan Amzile (FRA)	3
Georgian Nyéki (HUN)	0
Ermek Sakenov (KGZ)	3
Donato Cosenza (ITA)	0
Shavkatdzhon Rakhimov (TJK)	3
Enock Mwandila Poulsen (DEN)	0
Rashield Williams (BAH)	3
Miguel Ferrin (ECU)	0
Ayrin Ismetov (BUL)	3
Dean Walsh (IRL)	0
Manoj Kumar (IND)	3
Eslam Mohamed (EGY)	0

Round of 16
Lasha Guruli (GEO)	0
Pat McCormack (GBR)	3
Hassan Amzile (FRA)	3
Ermek Sakenov (KGZ)	0
Shavkatdzhon Rakhimov (TJK)	3
Rashield Williams (BAH)	0
Ayrin Ismetov (BUL)	0
Manoj Kumar (IND)	3

Quarterfinals
Pat McCormack (GBR)	3
Hassan Amzile (FRA)	0
Shavkatdzhon Rakhimov (TJK)	0
Manoj Kumar (IND)	3

Semifinals
Pat McCormack (GBR)	3
Manoj Kumar (IND)	0

Final

Final
1	Richardson Hitchins (HAI)	0
2	Pat McCormack (GBR)	3

=== Welterweight (69 kg) ===
The top four semifinalists and the quarterfinalist who lost to the eventual champion will qualify for the 2016 Summer Olympics.

Round of 64
	Score	
Josh Nyika (NZL)	KO	Abass Baraou (GER)
Dimitrios Tsagkrakos (GRE)	0–3	Paul Kroll (USA)
Oliver Flodin (SWE)	2–1	Gustiniano Abel Mina (ECU)
Muhammad Abdilrasoon (FIN)	3–0	Seyfe Kebede Kasto (ETH)
Zdeněk Chládek (CZE)	0–3	Anas Messaoudi (BEL)
Youba Sissokho (ESP)	2–1	Mandeep Jangra (IND)
Jamshid Nazari (NOR)	1–2	Yktyiar Shabdanbaev (KGZ)
Daniel Adamiec (POL)	0–3	Vasile Belous (MDA)
Souleymane Cissokho (FRA)	3–0	Gela Abashidze (GEO)
Thabiso Dlamini (SWZ)	0–3	Fano Kori (AUS)
Lyndel Marcellin (LCA)	KO	Simeon Chamov (BUL)
Ryuji Sato (JPN)	3–0	Ahmad Ghossoun (SYR)
Zeyad Eashash (JOR)	0–3	Roberto Custodio de Queiroz (BRA)
Sanjin Pol Vrgoč (CRO)	0–3	Abraham Josue Mora (CRC)
Daniel Alejandro Muñoz (CHI)	0–3	Amin Ghasemipour (IRI)

Section A

Round of 32
Eumir Marcial (PHI)	1
Abass Baraou (GER)	2
Danijel Babič (SLO)
Bahtiyor Mirzomukhammad (TJK)	TKO
Lester Martínez (GUA)	0
Paul Kroll (USA)	3
Oliver Flodin (SWE)	0
Imre Bacskai (HUN)	3
Alban Beqiri (ALB)	TKO
Muhammad Abdilrasoon (FIN)
Anas Messaoudi (BEL)	0
Adem Fetahović (BIH)	3
Juan Ramón Solano (DOM)	0
Youba Sissokho (ESP)	3
Yktyiar Shabdanbaev (KGZ)	0
Pavel Kastramin (BLR)	3

Round of 16
Abass Baraou (GER)	3
Bahtiyor Mirzomukhammad (TJK)	0
Paul Kroll (USA)	1
Imre Bacskai (HUN)	2
Alban Beqiri (ALB)	0
Adem Fetahović (BIH)	3
Youba Sissokho (ESP)	0
Pavel Kastramin (BLR)	3

Quarterfinals
Abass Baraou (GER)	0
Imre Bacskai (HUN)	3
Adem Fetahović (BIH)	0
Pavel Kastramin (BLR)	3

Semifinals
Imre Bacskai (HUN)	WO
Pavel Kastramin (BLR)

Section B

Round of 32
Juan Pablo Romero (MEX)	0
Vasile Belous (MDA)	3
Souleymane Cissokho (FRA)	3
Lee Dong-jin (KOR)	0
Yaroslav Samofalov (UKR)	3
Fano Kori (AUS)	0
Simeon Chamov (BUL)	3
Mohamed El-Abdoulli (CAN)	0
Allah Dad Rahimi (AFG)	3
Ryuji Sato (JPN)	0
Roberto Custodio de Queiroz (BRA)	0
Aaron Prince (TTO)	3
Kaupo Arro (EST)	3
Abraham Josue Mora (CRC)	0
Amin Ghasemipour (IRI)	0
Josh Kelly (GBR)	3

Round of 16
Vasile Belous (MDA)	0
Souleymane Cissokho (FRA)	3
Yaroslav Samofalov (UKR)	0
Simeon Chamov (BUL)	3
Allah Dad Rahimi (AFG)	1
Aaron Prince (TTO)	2
Kaupo Arro (EST)	0
Josh Kelly (GBR)	3

Quarterfinals
Souleymane Cissokho (FRA)	3
Simeon Chamov (BUL)	0
Aaron Prince (TTO)	0
Josh Kelly (GBR)	3

Semifinals
Souleymane Cissokho (FRA)	3
Josh Kelly (GBR)	0

Final

Final
1	Imre Bacskai (HUN)	0
2	Souleymane Cissokho (FRA)	3

=== Middleweight (75 kg) ===
The top four semifinalists and the quarterfinalist who lost to the eventual champion will qualify for the 2016 Summer Olympics.

Round of 64
	Score	
Andreas Kokkinos (CYP)	0–3	Vitali Bandarenka (BLR)
Dmytro Tretyak (FIN)	0–3	Narmandakhyn Shinebayar (MGL)
Damian Biacho (ESP)	3–0	Carl Leviticus Hield (BAH)
Valeri Sirbu (MDA)	1–2	Johan González (VEN)
Arjon Kajoshi (ALB)	3–0	Lay Kalenga Mishika (BEL)
Ali Jež (BIH)	0–3	Joseph Cherkashyn (CHI)
Jason Ramirez Blanco (CRC)	0–3	Raúl Sánchez (DOM)
Nick Frese (THA)	3–0	José Maria Vingul (GUA)
Joaquín Lingua (ARG)	0–3	Waheed Abdul-Ridha (IRQ)
Martin Larsen (NOR)	0–3	Benny Muziyo (ZAM)
Salvatore Cavallaro (ITA)	3–0	Onder Şipal (TUR)
Shabbos Negmatulloev (TJK)	0–3	Arslanbek Achilov (TKM)
Davide Faraci (SUI)	2–1	Pedro Lima (BRA)
Iliar Akhmetov (KGZ)	0–3	Keithland King (VIN)
Andrej Bakovič (SLO)	0–3	Lee Dong-yun (KOR)
Daine Smikle (JAM)	0–3	Daniel Daskalo (ISR)
Zaal Kvachatadze (GEO)	3–0	Joseph Jeudy (HAI)
Makoto Takahashi (JPN)	3–0	Edin Avdić (AUT)

Section A

Round of 32
Michael O'Reilly (IRL)	3
Vitali Bandarenka (BLR)	0
Narmandakhyn Shinebayar (MGL)	2
Damian Biacho (ESP)	1
Glory Carlos L'Muala (COD)	0
Johan González (VEN)	3
Arjon Kajoshi (ALB)	0
Kamran Shakhsuvarly (AZE)	3
Bogdan Juratoni (ROU)	3
Joseph Cherkashyn (CHI)	0
Raúl Sánchez (DOM)	3
Mekbeb Kemal Keraga (ETH)	0
Leon Chartoi (SWE)	3
Nick Frese (THA)	0
Waheed Abdul-Ridha (IRQ)	3
Xhek Paskali (GER)	0

Round of 16
Michael O'Reilly (IRL)	3
Narmandakhyn Shinebayar (MGL)	0
Johan González (VEN)	0
Kamran Shakhsuvarly (AZE)	3
Bogdan Juratoni (ROU)	0
Raúl Sánchez (DOM)	3
Leon Chartoi (SWE)
Waheed Abdul-Ridha (IRQ)	TKO

Quarterfinals
Michael O'Reilly (IRL)	3
Kamran Shakhsuvarly (AZE)	0
Raúl Sánchez (DOM)	0
Waheed Abdul-Ridha (IRQ)	3

Semifinals
Michael O'Reilly (IRL)	3
Waheed Abdul-Ridha (IRQ)	0

Section B

Round of 32
Marlo Delgado (ECU)	3
Benny Muziyo (ZAM)	0
Salvatore Cavallaro (ITA)	3
Max van der Pas (NED)	0
Kan Chia-wei (TPE)	0
Arslanbek Achilov (TKM)	3
Davide Faraci (SUI)	3
Nickson Abaka (KEN)	0
Siavash Omidi (IRI)	3
Keithland King (VIN)	0
Lee Dong-yun (KOR)	3
Tanveer Ahamad (PAK)	0
Daniel Daskalo (ISR)	0
Zaal Kvachatadze (GEO)	3
Makoto Takahashi (JPN)	0
Vikas Krishan Yadav (IND)	3

Round of 16
Marlo Delgado (ECU)	0
Salvatore Cavallaro (ITA)	3
Arslanbek Achilov (TKM)	3
Davide Faraci (SUI)	0
Siavash Omidi (IRI)	0
Lee Dong-yun (KOR)	3
Zaal Kvachatadze (GEO)	0
Vikas Krishan Yadav (IND)	3

Quarterfinals
Salvatore Cavallaro (ITA)	1
Arslanbek Achilov (TKM)	2
Lee Dong-yun (KOR)	0
Vikas Krishan Yadav (IND)	3

Semifinals
Arslanbek Achilov (TKM)	WO
Vikas Krishan Yadav (IND)

Final

Final
1	Michael O'Reilly (IRL)	WO
2	Arslanbek Achilov (TKM)

=== Light heavyweight (81 kg) ===
The top four semifinalists and the quarterfinalist who lost to the eventual champion will qualify for the 2016 Summer Olympics.

Round of 64
	Score	
Sadiq Umar (NGR)	RSC	Elly Ajowi Ochola (KEN)
Mohammad Al-Yazouri (JOR)	0–3	Jonathan Esquivel (USA)
Andrew Fermin (TTO)	0–3	Sumit Sangwan (IND)
Shi Guojun (CHN)	3–0	Mekhrubon Sanginov (TJK)
Luvuyo Sizani (RSA)	0–3	Hassan Saada (MAR)
Nikolajs Grišuņins (LAT)	3–0	Surkho Shamilov (NOR)
Artem Masliy (ISR)	WO	Alaaeldin Ghossoun (SYR)
Yang Hee-geun (KOR)	3–0	Israel Johnson (BAH)
Ádám Hámori (HUN)	0–3	Arkadiusz Szwedowicz (POL)
Tyson Sykes (NZL)	0–3	Tomi Honka (FIN)
Victor Ialimov (MDA)	0–3	Ainar Karlson (EST)

Section A

Round of 32
Petr Khamukov (RUS)	3
Sadiq Umar (NGR)	0
Denis Lazar (SLO)	3
Hakan Nuraydin (QAT)	0
Sandagsürengiin Erdenebayar (MGL)	2
Jonathan Esquivel (USA)	1
Sumit Sangwan (IND)	2
Juan Carlos Carrillo (COL)	1
Teymur Mammadov (AZE)	3
Shi Guojun (CHN)	0
Iago Kiziria (GEO)	3
Matúš Strnisko (SVK)	0
Alejandro Camacho (ESP)	2
Jack Bowen (AUS)	1
Hassan Saada (MAR)	3
Rogelio Romero (MEX)	0

Round of 16
Petr Khamukov (RUS)	3
Denis Lazar (SLO)	0
Sandagsürengiin Erdenebayar (MGL)	0
Sumit Sangwan (IND)	3
Teymur Mammadov (AZE)	2
Iago Kiziria (GEO)	1
Alejandro Camacho (ESP)	1
Hassan Saada (MAR)	2

Quarterfinals
Petr Khamukov (RUS)	3
Sumit Sangwan (IND)	0
Teymur Mammadov (AZE)	WO
Hassan Saada (MAR)

Semifinals
Petr Khamukov (RUS)
Teymur Mammadov (AZE)	WO

Section B

Round of 32
Oleksandr Khyzhniak (UKR)	RSC
Nikolajs Grišuņins (LAT)
Uke Smajli (SUI)	3
Awais Ali Khan (PAK)	0
Polyneikis Kalamaras (GRE)	3
Artem Masliy (ISR)	0
Yang Hee-geun (KOR)	0
Mikhail Dauhaliavets (BLR)	3
Džemal Bošnjak (BIH)	3
Arkadiusz Szwedowicz (POL)	0
Tomi Honka (FIN)	1
Syrja Marinaj (ALB)	2
Aziz Achilov (TKM)	0
Radoslav Pantaleev (BUL)	3
Ainar Karlson (EST)	0
Serge Michel (GER)	3

Round of 16
Oleksandr Khyzhniak (UKR)	3
Uke Smajli (SUI)	0
Polyneikis Kalamaras (GRE)	0
Mikhail Dauhaliavets (BLR)	3
Džemal Bošnjak (BIH)	3
Syrja Marinaj (ALB)	0
Radoslav Pantaleev (BUL)	0
Serge Michel (GER)	3

Quarterfinals
Oleksandr Khyzhniak (UKR)	0
Mikhail Dauhaliavets (BLR)	3
Džemal Bošnjak (BIH)	0
Serge Michel (GER)	3

Semifinals
Mikhail Dauhaliavets (BLR)	0
Serge Michel (GER)	3

Final

Final
1	Teymur Mammadov (AZE)	WO
2	Serge Michel (GER)

=== Heavyweight (91 kg) ===
The winner will qualify for the 2016 Summer Olympics.

Round of 32
	Score	
Josip-Bepo Filipi (CRO)	3–0	Davon Hamilton (BAH)
Seyda Keser (TUR)	3–0	Sergei Parenko (KGZ)
Arnold Phuzi (RSA)	0–3	Aziz Ali (KEN)
Kim Hyeong-kyu (KOR)	3–0	Marek Vaněček (CZE)
Deivis Blanco (COL)	0–3	Abdeljalil Abouhamda (MAR)
Salar Gholami (IRI)	3–0	Gergő Sávoly (HUN)
Dmytro Lisovyi (UKR)	2–1	Jahon Qurbonov (TJK)
Kevin Kuadjovi (TOG)	TKO	David Nyika (NZL)
Efetobor Apochi (NGR)	2–1	Siarhei Karneyeu (BLR)
Mustafa El-Molla (SWE)	0–3	Darren O'Neill (IRL)
Armend Xhoxhaj (KOS)	2–1	Amritpreet Singh (IND)
Miguel Angel Correa (CHI)	0–3	Cam Awesome (USA)
Stefan Nikolic (AUT)	0–3	Kristiyan Dimitrov (BUL)

Round of 16
Igor Jakubowski (POL)	3
Josip-Bepo Filipi (CRO)	0
Seyda Keser (TUR)	3
Aziz Ali (KEN)	0
Kim Hyeong-kyu (KOR)	0
Abdeljalil Abouhamda (MAR)	3
Salar Gholami (IRI)	3
Dmytro Lisovyi (UKR)	0
Roy Korving (NED)	3
David Nyika (NZL)	0
Efetobor Apochi (NGR)	3
Darren O'Neill (IRL)	0
Armend Xhoxhaj (KOS)	0
Cam Awesome (USA)	3
Kristiyan Dimitrov (BUL)	0
Julio Cesar Castillo (ECU)	3

Quarterfinals
Igor Jakubowski (POL)	3
Seyda Keser (TUR)	0
Abdeljalil Abouhamda (MAR)	3
Salar Gholami (IRI)	0
Roy Korving (NED)	3
Efetobor Apochi (NGR)	0
Cam Awesome (USA)	1
Julio Cesar Castillo (ECU)	2

Semifinals
Igor Jakubowski (POL)	2
Abdeljalil Abouhamda (MAR)	1
Roy Korving (NED)	0
Julio Cesar Castillo (ECU)	3

Final
Igor Jakubowski (POL)	3
Julio Cesar Castillo (ECU)	0

=== Super heavyweight (+91 kg) ===
The winner will qualify for the 2016 Summer Olympics.

Round of 32
	Score	
Satish Kumar (IND)	3–0	Manase Raikadroka (TGA)
Alexei Zavatin (MDA)	3–0	Mohammad Ali Shahidi (IRI)
Kieshno Major (BAH)	0–3	Konstantin Li (KGZ)
Haris Aksalič (SLO)	0–3	Petar Belberov (BUL)

Round of 16
Dean Gardiner (IRL)	RSC
Satish Kumar (IND)
Dašo Simeunović (BIH)	0
Viktor Vykhryst (UKR)	3
Joe Goodall (AUS)	0
Maxim Babanin (RUS)	3
Alexei Zavatin (MDA)	3
Kem Ljungquist Larsen (DEN)	0
Mu Haipeng (CHN)	TKO
Konstantin Li (KGZ)
Rafael Duarte Lima (BRA)	0
Guido Vianello (ITA)	3
Kim Do-hyeon (KOR)
Marlo Moore (USA)	RSC
Petar Belberov (BUL)	WO
Dashdondogiin Enkhbaatar (MGL)

Quarterfinals
Dean Gardiner (IRL)	3
Viktor Vykhryst (UKR)	0
Maxim Babanin (RUS)
Alexei Zavatin (MDA)	TKO
Mu Haipeng (CHN)	0
Guido Vianello (ITA)	3
Marlo Moore (USA)	2
Petar Belberov (BUL)	1

Semifinals
Dean Gardiner (IRL)	3
Alexei Zavatin (MDA)	0
Guido Vianello (ITA)	3
Marlo Moore (USA)	0

Final
Dean Gardiner (IRL)	0
Guido Vianello (ITA)	3
