= 2014 European Union Amateur Boxing Championships =

Boxing competitions

2014 Men's European Union Boxing Championships
- Host city: Sofia
- Country: Bulgaria
- Dates: 8–16 August

The Men's 2014 European Union Amateur Boxing Championships was held at the Sofia Sport Hall in Sofia, Bulgaria from 8 to 16 August. The 8th edition of the competition was organised by the European governing body for amateur boxing, the European Boxing Confederation.

== Medal winners ==
| Event | Gold | Silver | Bronze |
|---|---|---|---|
| Light flyweight (49 kg) | Georgi Andonov (BUL) | Stefan Mezei (SVK) | Manuel Cappai (ITA) |
| Light flyweight (49 kg) | Georgi Andonov (BUL) | Stefan Mezei (SVK) | Hugh Myres (IRL) |
| Flyweight (52 kg) | Alexander Riscan (MDA) | Elie Konki (FRA) | Viliam Tankó (SVK) |
| Flyweight (52 kg) | Alexander Riscan (MDA) | Elie Konki (FRA) | José Kelvin de la Nieve (ESP) |
| Bantamweight (56 kg) | Veaceslav Gojan (MDA) | Matti Koota (FIN) | Stefan Ivanov (BUL) |
| Bantamweight (56 kg) | Veaceslav Gojan (MDA) | Matti Koota (FIN) | Viktor Gálos (HUN) |
| Lightweight (60 kg) | David Oliver Joyce (IRL) | Otar Eranosyan (GEO) | Edgaras Skurdelis (LTU) |
| Lightweight (60 kg) | David Oliver Joyce (IRL) | Otar Eranosyan (GEO) | Michal Zatorsky (SVK) |
| Light welterweight (64 kg) | Vincenzo Mangiacapre (ITA) | Airin Ismetov (BUL) | András Vadász (HUN) |
| Light welterweight (64 kg) | Vincenzo Mangiacapre (ITA) | Airin Ismetov (BUL) | Dmitri Galagoț (MDA) |
| Welterweight (69 kg) | Simeon Chamov (BUL) | Eimantas Stanionis (LTU) | Souleymane Cissokho (FRA) |
| Welterweight (69 kg) | Simeon Chamov (BUL) | Eimantas Stanionis (LTU) | Vasile Belous (MDA) |
| Middleweight (75 kg) | Christian M'Billi Assomo (FRA) | Michael O'Reilly (IRL) | Victor Corobcevschii (MDA) |
| Middleweight (75 kg) | Christian M'Billi Assomo (FRA) | Michael O'Reilly (IRL) | Balázs Bacskai (HUN) |
| Light heavyweight (81 kg) | Valentino Manfredonia (ITA) | Darren O'Neill (IRL) | Bakary Mamadou Diabira (FRA) |
| Light heavyweight (81 kg) | Valentino Manfredonia (ITA) | Darren O'Neill (IRL) | Matúš Strnisko (SVK) |
| Heavyweight (91 kg) | Igor Jakubowski (POL) | Levan Guledani (GEO) | Victor Ialimov (MDA) |
| Heavyweight (91 kg) | Igor Jakubowski (POL) | Levan Guledani (GEO) | Tadas Tamašauskas (LTU) |
| Super heavyweight (+91 kg) | Frazer Clarke (ENG) | Guido Vianello (ITA) | Tony Yoka (FRA) |
| Super heavyweight (+91 kg) | Frazer Clarke (ENG) | Guido Vianello (ITA) | Mikheil Bakhtidze (GEO) |

== Medal table ==
* Host nation (Bulgaria)

| Rank | Nation | Gold | Silver | Bronze | Total |
|---|---|---|---|---|---|
| 1 | Bulgaria* | 2 | 1 | 1 | 4 |
| 1 | Italy | 2 | 1 | 1 | 4 |
| 3 | Moldova | 2 | 0 | 4 | 6 |
| 4 | Ireland | 1 | 2 | 1 | 4 |
| 5 | France | 1 | 1 | 3 | 5 |
| 6 | England | 1 | 0 | 0 | 1 |
| 6 | Poland | 1 | 0 | 0 | 1 |
| 8 | Georgia | 0 | 2 | 1 | 3 |
| 9 | Slovakia | 0 | 1 | 3 | 4 |
| 10 | Lithuania | 0 | 1 | 2 | 3 |
| 11 | Finland | 0 | 1 | 0 | 1 |
| 12 | Hungary | 0 | 0 | 3 | 3 |
| 13 | Spain | 0 | 0 | 1 | 1 |
| Totals (13 entries) | | 10 | 10 | 20 | 40 |
