= 2015 European Amateur Boxing Championships =

Boxing competitions

- Host city: Samokov
- Country: Bulgaria
- Nations: 44
- Dates: 8–15 August

The Men's 2015 European Amateur Boxing Championships were held in Samokov, Bulgaria from August 8 to August 15. It is the 41st edition of this biennial competition organised by the European governing body for amateur boxing, the EUBC.

44 nations took part in the competition, including Great Britain, who entered a united team for the first time - previously the constituent nations of England, Scotland and Wales each entered separately. Russia topped the medal table with 4 golds from 4 finals, while the unified British team won the most medals, 6, and reached the most finals, 5, although winning only 1 gold medal.

== Schedule ==
Date	Round
8-11 August 2015	Preliminaries
12 August 2015	Quarterfinals
14 August 2015	Semifinals
15 August 2015	Finals

== Medal winners ==
The medal winners are:

Event	Gold	Silver	Bronze
Light Flyweight (–49 kg)	Vasilii Egorov (RUS)	Harvey Horn (GBR)	Tinko Banabakov (BUL) Rufat Huseynov (AZE)
Flyweight (–52 kg)	Daniel Asenov (BUL)	Muhammad Ali (GBR)	Nandor Csoka (HUN) Kelvin de la Nieve (ESP)
Bantamweight (–56 kg)	Michael Conlan (IRL)	Qais Ashfaq (GBR)	Francesco Maietta (ITA) Aram Avagyan (ARM)
Lightweight (–60 kg)	Joseph Cordina (GBR)	Otar Eranosyan (GEO)	Enrico Lacruz (NED) Elian Demitrov (BUL)
Light Welterweight (–64 kg)	Vitaly Dunaytsev (RUS)	Pat McCormack (GBR)	Dean Walsh (IRL) Evaldas Petrauskas (LTU)
Welterweight (–69 kg)	Eimantas Stanionis (LTU)	Pavel Kastramin (BLR)	Clarence Goyeram Bojang (SWE) Youba Sissokho Ndiaye (ESP)
Middleweight (–75 kg)	Petr Khamukov (RUS)	Tomasz Jablonski (POL)	Anars Mursudovs (LAT) Salvatore Cavallaro (ITA)
Light Heavyweight (–81 kg)	Joe Ward (IRL)	Peter Mullenberg (NED)	Hrvoje Sep (CRO) Joshua Buatsi (GBR)
Heavyweight (–91 kg)	Evgeny Tishchenko (RUS)	Igor Jakubowski (POL)	Tervel Pulev (BUL) Nikolajs Grisunins (LAT)
Super Heavyweight (+91 kg)	Filip Hrgović (CRO)	Florian Schulz (GER)	Mihai Nistor (ROU) Petar Belberov (BUL)

=== Medal table ===
Below is the final medal table from the championships. The table is led by Russia, with four gold medals. Great Britain, with six medals, won the most medals in total.

Rank	Nation	Gold	Silver	Bronze	Total
1	Russia	4	0	0	4
2	Ireland	2	0	1	3
3	Great Britain	1	4	1	6
4	Bulgaria	1	0	4	5
5	Croatia	1	0	1	2
5	Lithuania	1	0	1	2
7	Poland	0	2	0	2
8	Georgia	0	1	1	2
8	Netherlands	0	1	1	2
10	Belarus	0	1	0	1
10	Germany	0	1	0	1
12	Italy	0	0	2	2
12	Latvia	0	0	2	2
12	Spain	0	0	2	2
15	Armenia	0	0	1	1
15	Azerbaijan	0	0	1	1
15	Hungary	0	0	1	1
15	Romania	0	0	1	1
15	Sweden	0	0	1	1
Totals (19 entries)		10	10	21	41

== Qualification for the World Championships ==
The event doubled as the second European qualification event for the World Championships, and the top six in each division qualified a quota place for their nation - in effect, all four medalists, and the following quarter-finalists, who were listed 5th and 6th by virtue of having been beaten by the eventual finalists.

49 kg

- Samuel Carmona (ESP)
- Dawid Jagodzinski (POL)

52 kg

- Ihor Sopinskyi (UKR)
- Koryun Soghomonyan (ARM)

56 kg

- Frederik Jensen (DEN)
- Mykola Butsenko (UKR)

60 kg

- Domenico Valentino (ITA)
- Adlan Abdurashidov (RUS)

64 kg

- Dimitri Galagot (MDA)
- Johann Orozco Ojedo (ESP)

69 kg

- Simeon Chamov (BUL)
- Adam Nolan (IRL)

75 kg

- Max van der Pas (NED)
- Valerii Kharmalov (UKR)

81 kg

- Mikhail Dauhaliavets (BLR)
- Cem Karlidag (TUR)

91 kg

- Siarhei Karneyeu (BLR)
- Roman Fress (GER)

+91 kg

- Mikheil Bakhtidze (GEO)
- Ali Eren Demirezen (TUR)
