= 2017 AIBA World Boxing Championships – Lightweight =

Boxing competitions

Lightweight at the 2017 AIBA World Boxing Championships
- Venue: Alsterdorfer Sporthalle
- Location: Hamburg, Germany
- Dates: 26 August–2 September
- Competitors: 25 from 25 nations

Medalists
gold medal	Sofiane Oumiha	France
silver medal	Lázaro Álvarez	Cuba
bronze medal	Otar Eranosyan	Georgia
bronze medal	Dorjnyambuugiin Otgondalai	Mongolia

The Lightweight competition at the 2017 AIBA World Boxing Championships was held from 26 August to 2 September 2017.

== Draw ==
=== Final ===
Final
2 September
(Cuba) Lázaro Álvarez	0
(France) Sofiane Oumiha	5

=== Top half ===
First round
26 August
(United States) Delante Johnson	0
(Netherlands) Enrico Lacruz	5
26 August
(Dominican Republic) Alexy de la Cruz	0
(Japan) Arashi Morisaka	4
26 August
(Russia) Gabil Mamedov	1
(Germany) Murat Yıldırım	4
26 August
(Kazakhstan) Adilet Kurmetov	2
(Georgia (country)) Otar Eranosyan	3
26 August
(Australia) Harry Garside	2
(Armenia) Karen Tonakanyan	3

Second round
28 August
(Cuba) Lázaro Álvarez	5
(Netherlands) Enrico Lacruz	0
28 August
(Japan) Arashi Morisaka	2
(Germany) Murat Yıldırım	3
28 August
(India) Shiva Thapa
(Georgia (country)) Otar Eranosyan	w/o
28 August
(Armenia) Karen Tonakanyan	0
(Uzbekistan) Elnur Abduraimov	5

Quarterfinals
29 August
(Cuba) Lázaro Álvarez	5
(Germany) Murat Yıldırım	0
29 August
(Georgia (country)) Otar Eranosyan	5
(Uzbekistan) Elnur Abduraimov	0

Semifinals
1 September
(Cuba) Lázaro Álvarez	5
(Georgia (country)) Otar Eranosyan	0

=== Bottom half ===
First round
26 August
(Israel) Pavel Ishchenko	5
(China) Shan Jun	0
26 August
(Mauritius) Jean Colin	0
(Venezuela) Luis Angel Cabrera	5
26 August
(England) Calum French	5
(Mexico) Alberto Mora García	0
26 August
(Kenya) Nick Okoth	0
(Brazil) Wanderson de Oliveira	5

Second round
28 August
(Mongolia) Dorjnyambuugiin Otgondalai	5
(Israel) Pavel Ishchenko	0
28 August
(Venezuela) Luis Angel Cabrera	5
(Algeria) Reda Benbaziz	0
28 August
(Ukraine) Iurii Shestak	4
(England) Calum French	1
28 August
(Brazil) Wanderson de Oliveira	0
(France) Sofiane Oumiha	5

Quarterfinals
29 August
(Mongolia) Dorjnyambuugiin Otgondalai	4
(Venezuela) Luis Angel Cabrera	1
29 August
(Ukraine) Iurii Shestak	0
(France) Sofiane Oumiha	5

Semifinals
1 September
(Mongolia) Dorjnyambuugiin Otgondalai	0
(France) Sofiane Oumiha	5
