= Boxing at the 2015 European Games – Men's 69 kg =

Boxing competitions

Men's welterweight boxing at the 2015 European Games
- Venue: Baku Crystal Hall
- Date: 17–27 June
- Competitors: 21 from 21 nations

Medalists
gold medal	Parviz Baghirov	Azerbaijan
silver medal	Alexander Besputin	Russia
bronze medal	Josh Kelly	Great Britain
bronze medal	Yaroslav Samofalov	Ukraine

The men's welterweight 69 kg boxing event at the 2015 European Games in Baku was held from 17 to 27 June at the Baku Crystal Hall.

== Results ==
=== Final ===
Final; 27 June
Alexander Besputin (RUS)	0
Parviz Baghirov (AZE)	3

=== Top half ===
Round of 32; 17 June
Mihails Pavlovs (LAT)	0
Youba Sissokho (ESP)	3
Mateusz Kostecki (POL)	0
Yaroslav Samofalov (UKR)	3
Constantin Olaru (ROU)	0
Gela Abashidze (GEO)	3

Round of 16; 20 June
Alexander Besputin (RUS)	3
Youba Sissokho (ESP)	0
Balázs Bacskai (HUN)	0
Souleymane Cissokho (FRA)	3
Simeon Chamov (BUL)	0
Yaroslav Samofalov (UKR)	3
Gela Abashidze (GEO)	3
Önder Şipal (TUR)	0

Quarterfinals; 23 June
Alexander Besputin (RUS)	3
Souleymane Cissokho (FRA)	0
Yaroslav Samofalov (UKR)	2
Gela Abashidze (GEO)	1

Semifinals; 26 June
Alexander Besputin (RUS)	3
Yaroslav Samofalov (UKR)	0

=== Bottom half ===
Round of 32; 17–18 June
Adam Nolan (IRL)	3
Alban Beqiri (ALB)	0
Anass Messaoudi (BEL)	1
Vasile Belous (MDA)	2

Round of 16; 20–21 June
Dario Morello (ITA)	0
Adam Nolan (IRL)	3
Josh Kelly (GBR)	2
Mahamed Nurudzinau (BLR)	1
Abass Baraou (GER)	3
Andrei Hartsenko (EST)	0
Vasile Belous (MDA)	0
Parviz Baghirov (AZE)	3

Quarterfinals; 23 June
Adam Nolan (IRL)	1
Josh Kelly (GBR)	2
Abass Baraou (GER)	0
Parviz Baghirov (AZE)	3

Semifinals; 26 June
Josh Kelly (GBR)	0
Parviz Baghirov (AZE)	3
