= Yaroslav Samofalov =

Ukrainian boxer (born 1995)

Personal information
- Nationality: Ukrainian
- Born: 16 January 1995 (age 31) Sumy, Ukraine
- Height: 1.77 m (5 ft 10 in)
- Weight: Welterweight

Boxing career
- Stance: Orthodox stance
Medal record
Men's amateur boxing
Representing Ukraine
European Games
| Bronze medal – third place | 2015 Baku | Welterweight |

Yaroslav Samofalov (Ukrainian: Ярослав Самофалов; born 16 January 1995 in Sumy, Ukraine) is a Ukrainian amateur boxer in the welterweight division. He won a bronze medal at the 2015 European Games.

He studied at the School of Physical Culture in Brovary. His first coach is V. Chubov. He was also coached by A. Bakhtin. He is silver medalist of the 2013 European Junior Boxing Championships. In 2014, he became Ukrainian champion after he won in the final against Yevhenii Barabanov. In 2016, he lost to Barabanov in the final of Ukrainian championships. He is also 2017 Ukrainian champion, 2021 silver medalist, 2018 and 2019 bronze medalist.

Samofalov achieved his first international success at the 2015 European Games in Baku. He first won against Mateusz Kostecki from Poland, Simeon Chamov from Bulgaria and Gela Abashidze from Georgia, but then lost in semifinals to Alexander Besputin from Russia, thus securing a bronze medal. At the 2015 World Championships in Doha, he won against Clarence Goyeram from Sweden, but lost in round of 16 to Roniel Iglesias from Cuba.

In 2016, Samofalov tried to qualify for the 2016 Summer Olympics. He first participated in the European Qualification Tournament in Samsun where he lost in round of 32 to Adem Fetahović from Bosnia and Herzegovina. Then he competed in the World Qualifying Tournament in Baku where he won against Fano Kori from Australia, but lost in round of 16 to Simeon Chamov from Bulgaria. Since Chamov lost in the next round to the future event champion Souleymane Cissokho from France, the Bulgarian got an Olympic quota.
