= Boxing at the 2018 Asian Games – Men's 60 kg =

Boxing competitions

Men's 60 kg at the 2018 Asian Games
- Venue: Jakarta International Expo
- Date: 24 August – 1 September 2018
- Competitors: 20 from 20 nations

Medalists
gold medal	Erdenebatyn Tsendbaatar	Mongolia
silver medal	Shunkor Abdurasulov	Uzbekistan
bronze medal	Rujakran Juntrong	Thailand
bronze medal	Shan Jun	China

The men's lightweight (60 kilograms) event at the 2018 Asian Games took place from 24 August to 1 September 2018 at Jakarta International Expo Hall, Jakarta, Indonesia.

== Schedule ==
All times are Western Indonesia Time (UTC+07:00)

Date	Time	Event
Friday, 24 August 2018	14:00	Round of 32
Sunday, 26 August 2018	13:00	Round of 16
Tuesday, 28 August 2018	13:00	Quarterfinals
Friday, 31 August 2018	14:00	Semifinals
Saturday, 1 September 2018	14:00	Final

== Results ==
Legend

- RSC — Won by referee stop contest
- WO — Won by walkover

=== Final ===
Final
Shunkor Abdurasulov (UZB)	2
Erdenebatyn Tsendbaatar (MGL)	3

=== Top half ===
Round of 32
Rujakran Juntrong (THA)	WO
Abdullateef Sadiq (QAT)
Tshering Samdrup (BHU)	WO
Mohammad Khaibar Nooristani (AFG)

Round of 16
Savon Monteiro (TLS)	0
Rujakran Juntrong (THA)	4
Farrand Papendang (INA)	5
Choi Hae-ju (KOR)	0
Shunkor Abdurasulov (UZB)	5
James Palicte (PHI)	0
Tshering Samdrup (BHU)
Argen Kadyrbek Uulu (KGZ)	RSC

Quarterfinals
Rujakran Juntrong (THA)	5
Farrand Papendang (INA)	0
Shunkor Abdurasulov (UZB)	3
Argen Kadyrbek Uulu (KGZ)	2

Semifinals
Rujakran Juntrong (THA)	0
Shunkor Abdurasulov (UZB)	5

=== Bottom half ===
Round of 32
Lai Chu-en (TPE)	5
Fahad Hassan (UAE)	0
Hursand Imankuliýew (TKM)	5
Arashi Morisaka (JPN)	0

Round of 16
Samatali Toltayev (KAZ)	3
Lai Chu-en (TPE)	2
Shan Jun (CHN)	RSC
Shiva Thapa (IND)
Erdenebatyn Tsendbaatar (MGL)	5
Ammar Jabbar (IRQ)	0
Hursand Imankuliýew (TKM)	5
Choe Chol-man (PRK)	0

Quarterfinals
Samatali Toltayev (KAZ)	0
Shan Jun (CHN)	5
Erdenebatyn Tsendbaatar (MGL)	5
Hursand Imankuliýew (TKM)	0

Semifinals
Shan Jun (CHN)	0
Erdenebatyn Tsendbaatar (MGL)	5
