= Tomášikovský presyp =

Coordinates: 48.085477°N 17.673559°E

- IUCN category III (natural monument or feature)
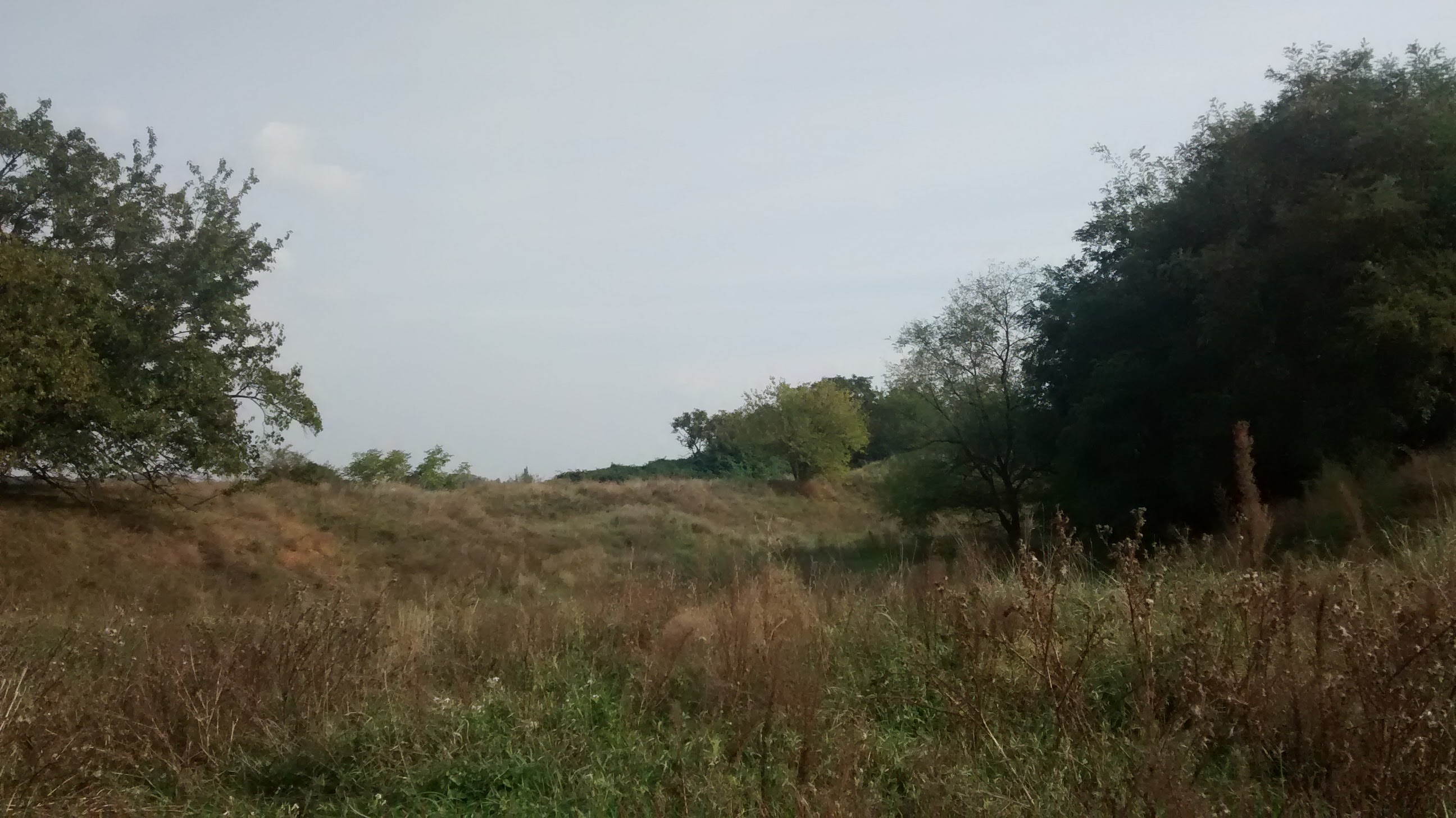
- Tomášikovský presyp
- Interactive map of Tomášikovský presyp
- Area: 0.009875 km^{2} (0.003813 sq mi)
- Established: 1973
- Governing body: ŠOP - S-CHKO Dunajské luhy

Tomášikovský presypy is a natural monument in Tomášikovo in the Trnava region of Slovakia. The natural monument covers an area of 0.9875 ha on the left bank of the Little Danube. It has a protection level of 4 under the Slovak nature protection system. It was established in 1973 and later amended in 1988.

== Description ==
The area was protected to preserve a sand dune with significant communities of psamophytic and xerophilous species of plants and animals. The sand dune was created under the influence of water and wind activity. The surroundings of the area consist of alluvial sediments of the Danube, namely sand and gravel.
