= 2009 European Union Amateur Boxing Championships =

Boxing competitions

2009 Men's European Union Boxing Championships
- Host city: Odense
- Country: Denmark
- Dates: 14–21 June
- Main venue: Odense Sports Centre

The Men's 2009 European Union Amateur Boxing Championships was held at the Odense Sports Centre in Odense, Denmark from June 14 to June 21. The 7th edition of the annual competition was organised by the European governing body for amateur boxing, EABA.

== Medal winners ==
| Event | Gold | Silver | Bronze |
|---|---|---|---|
| Light Flyweight (– 48 kilograms) | Tommy Stubbs; England | Jay Harris; Wales | Łukasz Maszczyk; Poland |
| Flyweight (– 51 kilograms) | Khalid Saeed Yafai; England | (Republic of Ireland) Declan Geraghty; Ireland | Norbert Kalucza; Hungary Joe Gage; Wales |
| Bantamweight (– 54 kilograms) | Denis Makarov; Germany | (Republic of Ireland) John Joe Nevin; Ireland | Andrew Selby; Wales Luke Campbell; England |
| Featherweight (– 57 kilograms) | (Republic of Ireland) David Oliver Joyce; Ireland | Sandro Schaer; Germany | Craig Evans; Wales Michał Chudecki; Poland |
| Lightweight (– 60 kilograms) | Eugen Burhard; Germany | Thomas Stalker; England | Filip Palic; Croatia (Republic of Ireland) Eric Donovan; Ireland |
| Light Welterweight (– 64 kilograms) | Bradley Saunders; England | Gyula Káté; Hungary | (Republic of Ireland) Philip Sutcliffe Jnr; Ireland Traian Lupu; Romania |
| Welterweight (– 69 kilograms) | Balázs Bacskai; Hungary | (Republic of Ireland) Willie McLaughlin; Ireland | (Netherlands) Orhan Ozturk; Holland Scott Cardle; England |
| Middleweight (– 75 kilograms) | (Republic of Ireland) Darren O'Neill; Ireland | Stephan Alms; Denmark | Bogdan Juratoni; Romania Konstantin Buga; Germany |
| Light Heavyweight (– 81 kilograms) | Imre Szellő; Hungary | Obed Mbwakongo; England | (Republic of Ireland) Kenneth Egan; Ireland Hrvoje Sep; Croatia |
| Heavyweight (– 91 kilograms) | (Republic of Ireland) Con Sheehan; Ireland | Juan Oliva Alemán; Spain | Dominik Milko; Slovakia Warren Baister; England |
| Super Heavyweight (+ 91 kilograms) | Erik Pfeifer; Germany | István Bernáth; Hungary | Francesco Rossano; Italy Răzvan Cojanu; Romania |

== Medal table ==
| Rank | Nation | Gold | Silver | Bronze | Total |
|---|---|---|---|---|---|
| 1 | Ireland (IRL) | 3 | 3 | 3 | 9 |
| 2 | England (ENG) | 3 | 2 | 3 | 8 |
| 3 | Germany (GER) | 3 | 1 | 1 | 5 |
| 4 | Hungary (HUN) | 2 | 2 | 2 | 6 |
| 5 | Poland (POL) | 0 | 1 | 1 | 2 |
| 6 | Denmark (DEN) | 0 | 1 | 0 | 1 |
| 6 | Spain (ESP) | 0 | 1 | 0 | 1 |
| 8 | Romania (ROM) | 0 | 0 | 3 | 3 |
| 8 | Wales (WAL) | 0 | 0 | 3 | 3 |
| 10 | Croatia (CRO) | 0 | 0 | 2 | 2 |
| 11 | Italy (ITA) | 0 | 0 | 1 | 1 |
| 11 | Netherlands (NED) | 0 | 0 | 1 | 1 |
| 11 | Slovakia (SVK) | 0 | 0 | 1 | 1 |
| Totals (13 entries) | | 11 | 11 | 21 | 43 |
