= Achilov =

Achilov or Açilow is a surname. Notable people with the surname include:

- Adkhamjon Achilov (born 1976), Uzbek wrestler
- Arslanbek Açilow (born 1993), Turkmen boxer
