= Otar Eranosyan =

Georgian boxer (born 1993)

Otar Eranosyan ოთარ ერანოსიანი
Personal information
- Nickname: Pitbull
- Nationality: Georgian
- Born: 20 August 1993 (age 33) Akhalkalaki, Georgia
- Height: 1.65 m (5 ft 5 in)
- Weight: Super featherweight Lightweight

Boxing career
- Stance: Orthodox

Boxing record
- Total fights: 14
- Wins: 14
- Win by KO: 7
- Losses: 0
Medal record
Men's amateur boxing
Representing Georgia
European Championships
Silver medal – second place	2014 Sofia	Lightweight
Silver medal – second place	2015 Samokov	Lightweight
World Championships
Bronze medal – third place	2017 Hamburg	Lightweight
European Games
Bronze medal – third place	2019 Minsk	Lightweight

Otar Eranosyan (born 20 August 1993) is a Georgian professional boxer of Armenian descent. As an amateur, he won silver medals at the 2014 European Union Amateur Boxing Championships and 2015 European Amateur Boxing Championships, as well as a bronze medal at the 2017 AIBA World Boxing Championships.

== Amateur boxing career ==
Eranosyan medaled twice at the European Amateur Boxing Championships. He won his first silver medal in 2014, when he lost to David Oliver Joyce in the finals, and his second silver medal in 2015, when he lost to Joseph Cordina in the finals.

Competing as a lightweight in the 2017 AIBA World Boxing Championships, Eranosyan won the bronze medal. He lost a unanimous decision to the eventual silver medal winner Lazaro Alvarez.

Eranosyan participated in the 2019 European Games, competing as a lightweight. He earned his place in the semifinals with decision wins against Jordan Rodriguez and Javid Chalabiyev, but lost a decision in turn to the eventual silver medalist Gabil Mamedov.

== Professional boxing career ==
Eranosyan made his professional debut against DeShawn Kennedy on 28 August 2020. He won the fight by a second-round knockout. Eranosyan amassed a 7–0 record during the next seven months, with five stoppage victories. Eranosyan had his first step-up in competition when he faced Jose Argel for the vacant WBA Continental Americas super featherweight title on 21 May 2021, on the undercard of the WBO NABO light flyweight title bout between champion Jonathan Gonzalez and challenger Armando Torres. Eranosyan justified his role as the favorite, and won the fight by unanimous decision. Two of the judges scored the fight 100–90 in his favor, while the third judge scored it 99–91 for him.

Eranosyan faced the 35-fight veteran Juan Carlos Pena on 13 August 2021, in the co-main event of a USA Telemundo broadcast card. He won the fight by a fourth-round technical knockout, stopping Pena 39 seconds into the round. Eranosyan next faced the 12–1 Alejandro Guerrero on 24 September 2021. The fight was scheduled for the undercard of the JaRico O'Quinn and Saul Sanchez bantamweight bout, which was broadcast by Showtime. He won the fight by unanimous decision, with scores of 79–73, 78–74 and 78–74.

Eranosyan was scheduled to face the undefeated Starling Castillo on 7 January 2022, on the undercard of Showtime's “ShoBox: The New Generation” series. He won the fight by a dominant unanimous decision, with two judges awarding him every single round of the fight, while the third judge scored only a single round for Castillo. Eranosyan knocked Castillo down twice in the opening round of the bout.

Eranosyan faced Edy Valencia Mercado on 17 May 2023. He won the fight by unanimous decision, with two scorecards of 97–93 and one scorecard of 98–92.

Eranosyan next faced former WBA Super Featherweight champion Roger Gutiérrez in a WBA title eliminator. He overcame a knockdown early in the 2nd round to drop Gutierrez twice in the 8th round and force the ringside doctor to intervene before the 9th.

== Professional boxing record ==
14 fights	14 wins	0 losses
By knockout	7	0
By decision	7	0

No.	Result	Record	Opponent	Type	Round, time	Date	Location	Notes
14	Win	14–0	Roger Gutiérrez	RTD	8 (12), 3:00	9 Aug 2023	Whitesands Events Center, Plant City, Florida, US	
13	Win	13–0	Edy Valencia Mercado	UD	10	17 May 2023	Whitesands Events Center, Plant City, Florida, US	
12	Win	12–0	Cesar Juarez	UD	8	9 Sep 2022	Whitesands Events Center, Plant City, Florida, US	
11	Win	11–0	Starling Castillo	UD	8	7 Jan 2022	Caribe Royale Orlando, Orlando, Florida, US	
10	Win	10–0	Alejandro Guerrero	UD	8	24 Sep 2021	Central Park Community Center, Broken Arrow, Oklahoma, US	
9	Win	9–0	Juan Carlos Pena	TKO	4 (10), 0:39	13 Aug 2021	Osceola Heritage Park, Kissimmee, Florida, US	
8	Win	8–0	Jose Argel	UD	10	21 May 2021	Bryan Glazer Family JCC Auditorium, Tampa, Florida, US	Won vacant WBA Continental Americas super featherweight title
7	Win	7–0	Marco Antonio Mendoza Chico	TKO	2 (6), 0:45	26 Mar 2021	Media Pro Studios, Medley, Florida, US	
6	Win	6–0	Ezequiel Alberto Tevez	KO	4 (8), 0:49	6 Mar 2021	InterContinental Miami, Miami, Florida, US	
5	Win	5–0	Juan Carlos Pena	KO	4 (10), 2:23	30 Jan 2021	Four Ambassadors Hotel, Miami, Florida, US	Won vacant NABA-USA super featherweight title
4	Win	4–0	Ignacio Perrin	UD	6	20 Nov 2020	Media Plus Studios, Hialeah, Florida, US	
3	Win	3–0	Emiliano Martin Garcia	TKO	4 (8), 1:34	23 Oct 2020	Osceola Heritage Park, Kissimmee, Florida, US	
2	Win	2–0	Luis Valentin Portalatin	UD	6	2 Oct 2020	Osceola Heritage Park, Kissimmee, Florida, US	
1	Win	1–0	DeShawn Kennedy	KO	2 (4), 1:38	28 Aug 2020	Osceola Heritage Park, Kissimmee, Florida, US	
