= Petr Khamukov =

Russian boxer (born 1991)

Personal information
- Native name: Пётр Мухамедович Хамуков
- Full name: Petr Mukhamedovich Khamukov
- Nickname: Python
- Nationality: Russian
- Born: 15 July 1991 (age 34) Labinsk, Russia
- Height: 177 cm (5 ft 10 in)
- Weight: 81 kg (179 lb)

Sport
- Sport: Boxing
- Weight class: light heavyweight, middleweight

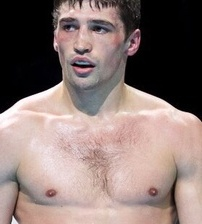
Petr Khamukov in 2015

Petr Mukhamedovich Khamukov (Russian: Пётр Мухамедович Хамуков; born 15 July 1991) is a Russian amateur boxer of the light heavyweight class (formerly a middleweight). Member of the Russian Olympic Team for the 2016 Summer Olympics in Rio de Janeiro and the only active Russian boxer to hold two Olympic licenses in middleweight and light heavyweight.

In 2009 Khamukov became the Master of Sports of international class.

== Amateur career ==
- 2010
  - vice-champion of Russia
- 2012
  - Russian Championship bronze medal
  - winner of the Great Silk Road Tournament (Baku, AZ)
- 2013
  - Giraldo-Cordova Cardin Tournament Sala-Kid Chocolate tournament winner
  - Gee-Bee International Tournament winner
- 2014
  - vice-champion of Russia
- 2015
  - EUBC Amateur Championship winner
- 2016
  - upweighted to 81 kg
  - Canaria Gran Boxeo Open winner
  - 2016 Aiba World Olympic Qualifying Tournament bronze medalist and olympic license winner
  - 2016 Russian Championship gold medal

== 2016 Olympics ==
In 2015, Petr Khamukov wins his first Olympic license in middleweight after a sequence of successful matches in AIBA's semi-professional World Series of Boxing events.

In 2016, Petr decides to upweight to light heavyweight division, since Russian Olympic Team didn't have a licensed olympian for this weight. To acquire the license, Petr enters the 2016 AIBA World Olympic Qualifying Tournament and wins three bouts against Sadiq Umar (NGR), Denis Lazar (SLO) and Sumit Sangwan (IND).

In July 2016, Petr Khamukov is officially announced as Russian Olympic Team member in light heavyweight-class boxing.
