= 2013 Asian Amateur Boxing Championships =

Boxing competitions

2013 Asian Boxing Championships
- Host city: Amman, Jordan
- Dates: 30 June – 9 July 2013
- Main venue: King Hussein Youth City Arena

The 27th edition of the Men's Asian Amateur Boxing Championships was held from June 30 to July 9, 2013, in Amman, Jordan.

== Medal summary ==
Event	Gold	Silver	Bronze
Light flyweight 49 kg	Temirtas Zhussupov; Kazakhstan	Devendro Singh; India	Lü Bin; China
Light flyweight 49 kg	Temirtas Zhussupov; Kazakhstan	Devendro Singh; India	Tosho Kashiwazaki; Japan
Flyweight; 52 kg	Azat Usenaliev; Kyrgyzstan	Shakhobidin Zoirov; Uzbekistan	Tanes Ongjunta; Thailand
Flyweight; 52 kg	Azat Usenaliev; Kyrgyzstan	Shakhobidin Zoirov; Uzbekistan	Murtadha Raad; Iraq
Bantamweight; 56 kg	Shiva Thapa; India	Obada Al-Kasbeh; Jordan	Omurbek Malabekov; Kyrgyzstan
Bantamweight; 56 kg	Shiva Thapa; India	Obada Al-Kasbeh; Jordan	Kenji Fujita; Japan
Lightweight; 60 kg	Berik Abdrakhmanov; Kazakhstan	Sailom Adi; Thailand	Bariadigiin Javkhlan; Mongolia
Lightweight; 60 kg	Berik Abdrakhmanov; Kazakhstan	Sailom Adi; Thailand	Anvar Yunusov; Tajikistan
Light welterweight 64 kg	Merey Akshalov; Kazakhstan	Uranchimegiin Mönkh-Erdene; Mongolia	Ermek Sakenov; Kyrgyzstan
Light welterweight 64 kg	Merey Akshalov; Kazakhstan	Uranchimegiin Mönkh-Erdene; Mongolia	Manoj Kumar; India
Welterweight; 69 kg	Daniyar Yeleussinov; Kazakhstan	Mandeep Jangra; India	Jargalyn Otgonjargal; Mongolia
Welterweight; 69 kg	Daniyar Yeleussinov; Kazakhstan	Mandeep Jangra; India	Mohammad Al-Assi; Jordan
Middleweight; 75 kg	Zhanibek Alimkhanuly; Kazakhstan	Navruz Jafoev; Tajikistan	Sajjad Mehrabi; Iran
Middleweight; 75 kg	Zhanibek Alimkhanuly; Kazakhstan	Navruz Jafoev; Tajikistan	Waheed Abdul-Ridha; Iraq
Light heavyweight 81 kg	Oybek Mamazulunov; Uzbekistan	Adilbek Niyazymbetov; Kazakhstan	Anavat Thongkrathok; Thailand
Light heavyweight 81 kg	Oybek Mamazulunov; Uzbekistan	Adilbek Niyazymbetov; Kazakhstan	Ehsan Rouzbahani; Iran
Heavyweight; 91 kg	Anton Pinchuk; Kazakhstan	Ihab Al-Matbouli; Jordan	Mirzobek Hasanov; Uzbekistan
Heavyweight; 91 kg	Anton Pinchuk; Kazakhstan	Ihab Al-Matbouli; Jordan	Sergei Parenko; Kyrgyzstan
Super heavyweight +91 kg	Ivan Dychko; Kazakhstan	Izzatulla Ergashev; Uzbekistan	Mohammad Mlaiyes; Syria
Super heavyweight +91 kg	Ivan Dychko; Kazakhstan	Izzatulla Ergashev; Uzbekistan	Jasem Delavari; Iran

== Medal table ==
Rank	Nation	Gold	Silver	Bronze	Total
1	Kazakhstan	7	1	0	8
2	India	1	2	1	4
2	Uzbekistan	1	2	1	4
4	Kyrgyzstan	1	0	3	4
5	Jordan	0	2	1	3
6	Mongolia	0	1	2	3
6	Thailand	0	1	2	3
8	Tajikistan	0	1	1	2
9	Iran	0	0	3	3
10	Iraq	0	0	2	2
10	Japan	0	0	2	2
12	China	0	0	1	1
12	Syria	0	0	1	1
Totals (13 entries)		10	10	20	40
