= Anvar Yunusov =

Tajikistani boxer

Personal information
- Born: February 1, 1987 (age 39) Dushanbe, Tajik SSR, Soviet Union
- Height: 1.69 m (5 ft 6 1/2 in)

Sport
- Sport: Boxing
- Event: Bantam (56kg)
- Coached by: Mirzo Shamsiev
Medal record
Men's Boxing
Representing Tajikistan
World Championships
Bronze medal – third place	2011 Baku	Bantamweight
Asian Championships
Gold medal – first place	2011 Incheon	Bantamweight
Bronze medal – third place	2013 Amman	Bantamweight
Bronze medal – third place	2007 Ulan Bator	Flyweight

Anvar Yunusov (born February 1, 1987, Dushanbe) is a Tajikistani boxer who currently competes as a professional in the super featherweight division. As an amateur, he won bronze at the 2011 amateur world championships, gold at the 2011 Asian championships, and qualified for the 2008, 2012 and 2016 Olympics. He is known for giving Asian Games winner Violito Payla his first ever stoppage defeat at the 2007 World Championships.

== Amateur career ==
Southpaw Yunusov beat Bato-Munko Vankeev at the 2005 World Championships but lost to surprise winner Lee Ok-Sung.

He finished second at the 2006 Military World Championships and the Ahmet Comet Cup 2007 where he beat Mirat Sarsenbayev but lost to local Kadri Kordel.

At the 2007 World Championships he stopped Payla, but lost to Samir Mammadov later.

At the 2008 Olympic qualifier he beat Payla again, then Mongol Luvsantseren Zorigtbaatar and North Korean Pak Jong Chol. In Beijing, he lost his quarterfinal to experienced Thai favorite Somjit Jongjohor.

At the 2012 Olympics, he lost his first bout to Oscar Valdez.

He competed in the lightweight division at the 2016 Summer Olympics in Rio de Janeiro. He defeated Shan Jun of China in the first round, but was defeated by Robson Conceição of Brazil in the next round. Yunusov finished 9th overall in the division. He was the flag bearer for Tajikistan during the closing ceremony.

== Professional career ==
On July 27, 2019, Yunusov challenged Héctor García for the WBA Fedelatin featherweight title in Santo Domingo, Dominican Republic. Yunusov lost via split decision.

== Professional boxing record ==
9 fights	8 wins	1 loss
By knockout	4	0
By decision	4	1

No.	Result	Record	Opponent	Type	Round, time	Date	Location	Notes
9	Loss	8–1	Héctor García	SD	11	Jul 27, 2019	Coliseo Carlos 'Teo' Cruz, Santo Domingo, Dominican Republic	For WBA Fedelatin featherweight title
8	Win	8–0	Ángel Luna	TKO	2 (8), 0:56	Jun 22, 2019	2300 Arena, Philadelphia, Pennsylvania, U.S.	
7	Win	7–0	Carlos Colón	UD	8	Mar 29, 2019	SugarHouse Casino, Philadelphia, Pennsylvania, U.S.	Won vacant USBF Silver junior lightweight title
6	Win	6–0	Jose Salinas	TKO	7 (8), 0:41	Nov 16, 2018	Sands Bethlehem Event Center, Bethlehem, Pennsylvania, U.S.	
5	Win	5–0	Ángel Monrreal	TKO	1 (8), 2:39	Sep 14, 2018	2300 Arena, Philadelphia, Pennsylvania, U.S.	
4	Win	4–0	Mike Oliver	TKO	4 (8), 1:12	Aug 25, 2018	Hive Basketball Academy, Greensboro, North Carolina, U.S.	
3	Win	3–0	Stephon McIntyre	UD	6	Jun 30, 2018	Greensboro Coliseum, Greensboro, North Carolina, U.S.	
2	Win	2–0	Deo Kizito	UD	4	May 11, 2018	SugarHouse Casino, Philadelphia, Pennsylvania, U.S.	
1	Win	1–0	Justin Savi	UD	6	May 20, 2017	Renaissance Palm Springs Hotel, Palm Springs, California, U.S.	
