= Shunkor Abdurasulov =

Uzbekistani boxer (born 1998)

Personal information
- Nationality: Uzbekistan
- Born: 25 May 1998 (age 28) Tashkent, Uzbekistan

Boxing career
Medal record
Asian Games
Silver medal – second place	2018 Jakarta	Lightweight
Military World Games
Silver medal – second place	2019 Wuhan	Lightweight
World Military Boxing Championships
Gold medal – first place	2021 Moscow	Lightweight

Shunkor Abdurasulov (born 25 May 1998) is an Uzbekistani boxer. He won the silver medal in the men's 60 kg event at the 2018 Asian Games.

At the 2016 AIBA Youth World Boxing Championships, he won one of the bronze medals in the men's 56 kg event.

At the 2019 Military World Games held in Wuhan, China, he won the silver medal in the men's 60 kg event.
