= Boxing at the 2016 Summer Olympics – Men's welterweight =

Men's welterweight boxing at the Games of the XXXI Olympiad
- Venue: Riocentro – Pavilion 6
- Date: 7–17 August 2016
- Competitors: 28 from 28 nations

Medalists
1st place, gold medalist(s)		Daniyar Yeleussinov	Kazakhstan
2nd place, silver medalist(s)		Shakhram Giyasov	Uzbekistan
3rd place, bronze medalist(s)		Mohammed Rabii	Morocco
3rd place, bronze medalist(s)		Souleymane Cissokho	France

The men's welterweight boxing competition at the 2016 Summer Olympics in Rio de Janeiro was held from 7–17 August at the Riocentro.

== Schedule ==
All times are Brasília Time (UTC−3).

Date	Time	Round
Sunday, 7 August 2016	11:51	Round of 32
Monday, 8 August 2016	12:08	Round of 32
Thursday, 11 August 2016	12:43	Round of 16
Saturday, 13 August 2016	12:22	Quarter-finals
Monday, 15 August 2016	12:38	Semi-finals
Wednesday, 17 August 2016	16:46	Final

== Results ==
=== Finals ===
Semi-finals
Mohammed Rabii (MAR)	0
Shakhram Giyasov (UZB)	3
Souleymane Cissokho (FRA)	0
Daniyar Yeleussinov (KAZ)	3

Final
Shakhram Giyasov (UZB)	0
Daniyar Yeleussinov (KAZ)	3

=== Top half ===
Round of 32
Rayton Okwiri (KEN)	2
Andrey Zamkovoy (RUS)	1
Byambyn Tüvshinbat (MGL)	3
Alberto Palmetta (ARG)	0
Zohir Kedache (ALG)	0
Steven Donnelly (IRL)	3
Eimantas Stanionis (LTU)	3
Liu Wei (CHN)	0
Youba Sissokho (ESP)	0
Shakhram Giyasov (UZB)	3
Winston Hill (FIJ)	0
Vladimir Margaryan (ARM)	3

Round of 16
Mohammed Rabii (MAR)	3
Rayton Okwiri (KEN)	0
Byambyn Tüvshinbat (MGL)	1
Steven Donnelly (IRL)	2
Eimantas Stanionis (LTU)	0
Shakhram Giyasov (UZB)	3
Vladimir Margaryan (ARM)
Roniel Iglesias (CUB)	TKO

Quarter-finals
Mohammed Rabii (MAR)	2
Steven Donnelly (IRL)	1
Shakhram Giyasov (UZB)	3
Roniel Iglesias (CUB)	0

Semi-finals
Mohammed Rabii (MAR)	0
Shakhram Giyasov (UZB)	3

=== Bottom half ===
Round of 32
Souleymane Cissokho (FRA)	3
Imre Bacskai (HUN)	0
Sailom Adi (THA)	2
Pavel Kastramin (BLR)	1
Simeon Chamov (BUL)	3
Onur Şipal (TUR)	0
Gabriel Maestre (VEN)	2
Arajik Marutjan (GER)	1
Juan Pablo Romero (MEX)	1
Vincenzo Mangiacapre (ITA)	2
Josh Kelly (GBR)	3
Walid Sedik Mohamed (EGY)	0

Round of 16
Parviz Baghirov (AZE)	0
Souleymane Cissokho (FRA)	3
Sailom Adi (THA)	3
Simeon Chamov (BUL)	0
Gabriel Maestre (VEN)	WO
Vincenzo Mangiacapre (ITA)	–
Josh Kelly (GBR)	0
Daniyar Yeleussinov (KAZ)	3

Quarter-finals
Souleymane Cissokho (FRA)	3
Sailom Adi (THA)	0
Gabriel Maestre (VEN)	0
Daniyar Yeleussinov (KAZ)	3

Semi-finals
Souleymane Cissokho (FRA)	0
Daniyar Yeleussinov (KAZ)	3
