= Valentino Manfredonia =

Italian boxer

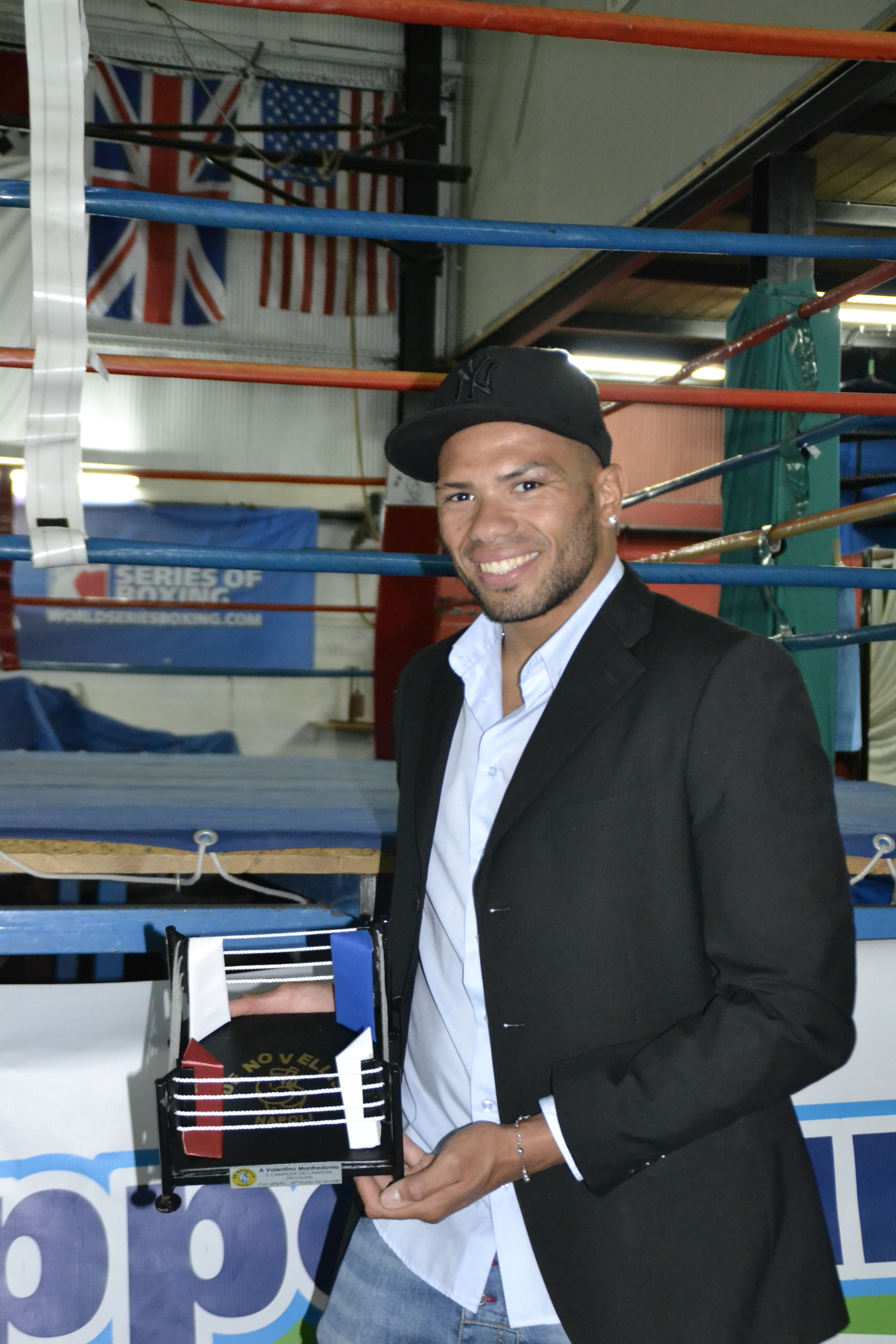

Personal information
- Born: 29 September 1989 (age 36) Jaboatão dos Guararapes, Brazil

Sport
- Sport: Amateur boxing
Medal record
Men's amateur boxing
Representing Italy
European Championships
Bronze medal – third place	2017 Kharkiv	Light heavyweight

Valentino Manfredonia (born 29 September 1989) is a Brazilian-born Italian professional boxer. As an amateur he competed at the 2016 Summer Olympics in the men's light heavyweight event, in which he was eliminated in the first round by Mikhail Dauhaliavets of Belarus.

== Professional boxing record ==
2 fights	2 wins	0 losses
By decision	2	0

No.	Result	Record	Opponent	Type	Round, time	Date	Location	Notes
2	Win	2–0	(Serbia) Milos Jankovic	UD	6	11 Oct 2019	PalaTrento, Trento, Italy	
1	Win	1–0	(Serbia) Sokol Arsic	UD	4	11 Jul 2019	Stadio Nicola Pietrangeli, Rome, Italy	
