= Alexander Besputin =

Russian boxer (born 1991)

Alexander Besputin Александр Беспутин
Personal information
- Born: 26 April 1991 (age 35) Kamensk-Uralsky, Russia
- Height: 5 ft 7 in (170 cm)
- Weight: Welterweight

Boxing career
- Reach: 68 in (173 cm)
- Stance: Southpaw

Boxing record
- Total fights: 16
- Wins: 15
- Win by KO: 11
- No contests: 1
Medal record
Men's Boxing
Representing Russia
European Championships
Gold medal – first place	Minsk 2013	Welterweight
European Games
Silver medal – second place	Baku 2015	Welterweight

Alexander Alexandrovich Besputin (Russian: Александр Александрович Беспутин; born 26 April 1991) is a Russian professional boxer. As an amateur he won a gold medal at the 2013 European Championships and silver at the 2015 European Games.

== Professional career ==
=== Besputin vs. Butaev ===
Besputin turned professional in 2015 and compiled a record of 13–0 before getting an opportunity to fight for a world title against fellow Russian boxer Radzhab Butaev. Butaev was ranked #3 by the WBA at welterweight at the time. In the fight Besputin would go on to win via unanimous decision to capture the WBA (Regular) and EBP welterweight titles.

=== Six-month suspension ===
In January 2020 it was reported that Besputin had failed a post-fight drug test for the bout with Butaev, testing positive for the performance-enhancing drug Ligandrol. Upon hearing the news, Butaev said, "Ahead of the fight my team insisted on VADA testing while he and his team were denying it all along, and even after I agreed to pay for both sides, including his costs, he was very reluctant. After finally enrolling he attempted to ignore the requests from VADA for two weeks for his whereabouts to be tested." Besputin elected to have a secondary 'B sample' tested, which also came back positive for the same substance in June. Following the second test result, the WBA stripped Besputin of his title and issued a six-month suspension on 4 July.

=== Besputin vs. Plotnikov ===
On 20 March 2021, Besputin fought Viktor Plotnikov in his comeback fight after his suspension. Besputin dominated in the first two rounds, which prompted the opposition's trainer to end the fight right after the end of the second round.

== Professional boxing record ==
16 fights	15 wins	0 losses
By knockout	11	0
By decision	4	0
No contests	1	

No.	Result	Record	Opponent	Type	Round, time	Date	Location	Notes
16	Win	15–0 (1)	Mauricio Pintor	KO	5 (12), 1:47	11 Sep 2021	Ivan Yarygin Sports Palace, Krasnoyarsk, Russia	
15	Win	14–0 (1)	Viktor Plotnikov	RTD	2 (10), 3:00	20 Mar 2021	Khodynka Ice Palace, Moscow, Russia	
14	NC	13–0 (1)	Radzhab Butaev	NC	12	30 Nov 2019	Monte Carlo Casino, Monte Carlo, Monaco	Originally a UD win for Besputin, later ruled an NC after Besputin failed a drug test; For vacant WBA (Regular) and EBP welterweight titles
13	Win	13–0	Alfredo Rodolfo Blanco	UD	10	12 Apr 2019	Staples Center, Los Angeles, California, US	Retained IBF-USBA welterweight title
12	Win	12–0	Juan Carlos Abreu	UD	10	8 Dec 2018	Hulu Theater, New York City, New York, US	Retained IBF-USBA welterweight title
11	Win	11–0	Alan Sanchez	TKO	9 (10), 1:44	14 Sep 2018	Save Mart Center, Fresno, California, US	Won vacant IBF-USBA welterweight title
10	Win	10–0	Saul Corral	KO	3 (10), 1:34	26 May 2018	Save Mart Center, Fresno, California, US	
9	Win	9–0	Wesley Tucker	RTD	5 (8), 3:00	16 Feb 2018	Grand Sierra Resort and Casino, Reno, Nevada, US	
8	Win	8–0	Juan Ruiz	KO	7 (8), 2:51	11 Nov 2017	Save Mart Center, Fresno, California, US	
7	Win	7–0	Breidis Prescott	UD	8	22 Apr 2017	Dignity Health Sports Park, Carson, California, US	
6	Win	6–0	Gilberto Pereira dos Santos	UD	6	27 Jan 2017	Sportsmen's Lodge, Los Angeles, California, US	
5	Win	5–0	Azael Cosio	RTD	6 (8), 3:00	5 Nov 2016	Thomas & Mack Center, Paradise, Nevada, US	
4	Win	4–0	Kevin Womack Jr	KO	1 (6), 2:08	6 Aug 2016	Casino Del Sol, Tucson, Arizona, US	
3	Win	3–0	Christon Edwards	RTD	4 (6), 3:00	2 Apr 2016	Oceanview Pavilion, Port Hueneme, California, US	
2	Win	2–0	K'Lon Spencer	TKO	3 (4), 0:50	16 Jan 2016	The Bomb Factory, Dallas, Texas, US	
1	Win	1–0	Fernando Paliza	KO	2 (6), 2:59	12 Dec 2015	Civic Auditorium, Glendale, California, US	

== See also ==
- List of southpaw stance boxers

Sporting positions
Regional boxing titles
Vacant Title last held by Dusty Hernández-Harrison	IBF-USBA welterweight champion 14 September 2018 – November 2019; Vacated	Vacant Title next held by Ivan Golub
