= Igor Jakubowski =

Polish boxer

Personal information
- Born: Igor Paweł Jakubowski; 6 August 1992 (age 33) Żory, Poland

Boxing career
Medal record
Men's amateur boxing
Representing Poland
European Amateur Championships
Silver medal – second place	2015 Samokov	Heavyweight
EU Amateur Championships
Gold medal – first place	2014 Sofia	Heavyweight

Igor Paweł Jakubowski (born 6 August 1992) is a Polish boxer. He competed in the men's heavyweight event at the 2016 Summer Olympics.
