= Waheed Abdul-Ridha =

Iranian boxer (born 1983)

Personal information
- Nationality: Iraqi
- Born: 22 May 1983 (age 43)

Boxing career
Medal record
Men's amateur boxing
Representing Iraq
Asian Championships
Bronze medal – third place	2013 Amman	Middleweight
Bronze medal – third place	2015 Bangkok	Middleweight
World Military Boxing Championships
Bronze medal – third place	2021 Moscow	Super welterweight

Waheed Abdul-Ridha Waheed Karaawi (born May 22, 1983) is an Iraqi boxer. He competed at the 2016 Summer Olympics in the men's middleweight event, in which he was eliminated in the round of 32 by Misael Rodríguez. He was the flag bearer for Iraq at the Parade of Nations.
