= Obada Al-Kasbeh =

Jordanian boxer (born 1994)

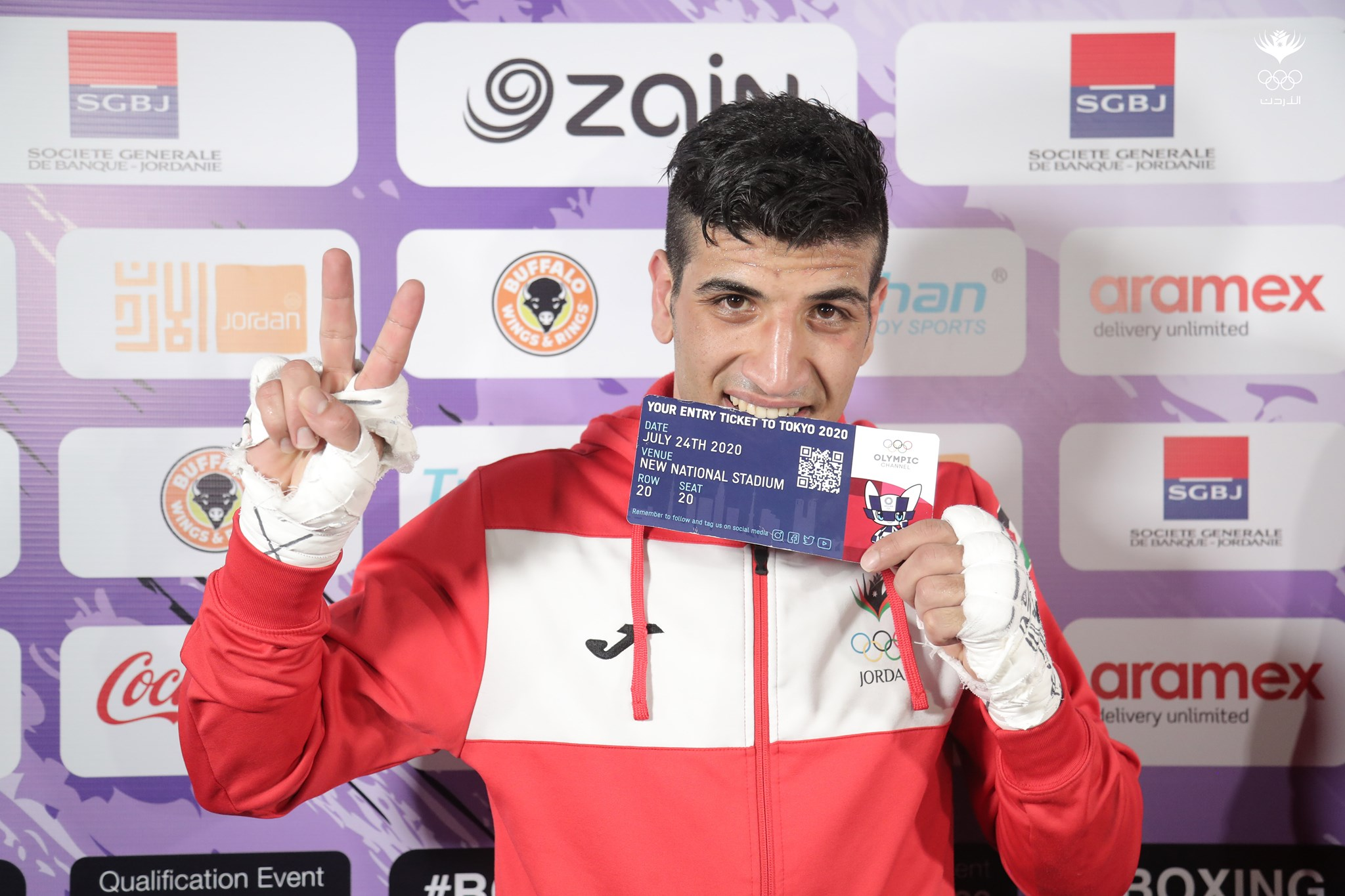

Personal information
- Born: 30 July 1994 (age 31)

Sport
- Country: Jordan
- Sport: Boxing
Medal record
Men's amateur boxing
Representing Jordan
Asian Games
Bronze medal – third place	2014 Incheon	Lightweight
Asian Championships
Silver medal – second place	2013 Amman	Bantamweight
Silver medal – second place	2019 Bangkok	Light welterweight

Obada Al-Kasbeh (born 30 July 1994) is a Jordanian boxer. He competed in the men's light welterweight competition at the 2016 Summer Olympics.
