= Samuel Carmona =

Spanish boxer (born 1996)

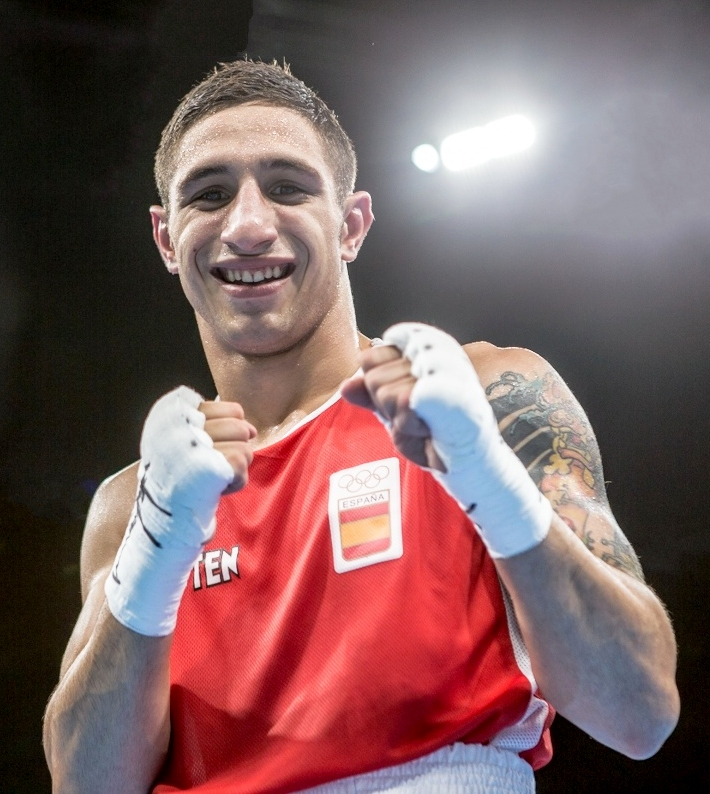
- Carmona at the 2016 Olympics

Personal information
- Nationality: Spanish
- Born: Samuel Carmona Heredia; 28 May 1996 (age 30) Las Palmas, Spain
- Height: 5 ft 4 in (163 cm)
- Weight: Flyweight

Boxing career
- Stance: Orthodox

Boxing record
- Total fights: 11
- Wins: 10
- Win by KO: 4
- Losses: 1
Medal record
Men's amateur boxing
Representing Spain
European Championships
Bronze medal – third place	2017 Kharkiv	Light flyweight

Samuel Carmona Heredia (Note: In this Spanish name, the first or paternal surname is Carmona and the second or maternal family name is Heredia.) (born 28 May 1996) is a Spanish professional boxer. As an amateur, he competed in the light flyweight event at the 2016 Summer Olympics where he managed to reach the quarterfinals.

== Amateur boxing career ==
He began his career in 2008. In 2013, was runner-up in the Young Amateur Championship of Spain, 52 kg, defeating José María González for 19: 6 in the semifinal and fell in the final 10: 6 against Grabriel Escobar. In 2014, he again fell against Escobar, this time in the semifinals by 2: 1, and beat Ivan Chaves in the fight for third place. That same year, he won the Tournament of Spain in the category of less than 49 kg, when he defeated Gustavo de la Nuez in the final.

In 2015, he won the Spanish championship, winning the final against Brandon Moreno Núñez, receiving a call from Rafael Lozano to will become part of the selection española. On 4 June at the 2015 European Championships held in Samokov (Bulgaria), he finished in 5th place, which qualified for the 2015 World Championship Amateur Boxing in Doha.

He qualified for the 2016 Summer Olympics in the world Olympic qualifiers in Baku, to qualify for the final defeating in the semifinal Indian pugilist Devendro Singh by 3 to 0.8 before (April), he had lost in the battle for third and since giving place for the Games in the Olympic Qualifying European Championship in Samsun (Turkey).

== Professional boxing career ==
Carmona made his professional debut against Alejandro Torres on 14 September 2019, and won the fight by a second-round knockout. Carmona was next scheduled to face Franklin Flores on 19 October 2019. He won the fight by a second-round knockout. Following this victory, Carmona signed with the Russia-based promoter Patriot Boxing Promotions. Accordingly, his next fight against Enrique Magsalin took place in Russia, on 21 December 2019. He won it by unanimous decision, with scores of 79–73, 79-73 and 78–74.

Carmona was scheduled to fight Jose Antonio Jimenez for the vacant WBA International flyweight title on 1 February 2020. He won his sole fight of the year by first-round knockout, stopping Jimenez after just 93 seconds.

Carmona was scheduled to face Joel Sanchez on 18 July 2021, after a 15-month hiatus from the sport. He won the fight by unanimous decision, with scores of 60–54, 60-54 and 60–53. Carmona faced Luis Fernando Villa, in his last fight of the year, on 3 December 2021. He won the fight by a first-round technical knockout. Carmona was booked to face Joel Cordova on 1 April 2022, on the undercard of the Sandor Martin and Jose Felix super lightweight bout. He won the fight by unanimous decision, with scores of 96–94, 96–93 and 97–93.

Carmona is scheduled to challenge the WBC flyweight champion Julio Cesar Martinez on 3 December 2022, at the Desert Diamond Arena in Glendale, Arizona. He stepped in as a replacement for McWilliams Arroyo, who withdrew from the bout with a neck injury, on a month's notice. He lost the fight by majority decision, with scores of 118–111, 117–112 and 114–114.

Carmona bounced back from his first professional loss with a unanimous decision victory over Anuar Salas on 16 September 2023. As this bout was an EBU Silver flyweight title eliminator, Carmona was next booked to face Aramis Torres for the vacant championship on 10 November 2023. He won the fight by unanimous decision, with two scorecards of 117–108 and one scorecard of 118–108 in his favor.

== Professional boxing record ==
13 fights	12 wins	1 loss
By knockout	5	0
By decision	7	1

No.	Result	Record	Opponent	Type	Round, time	Date	Location	Notes
13	Win	12–1	Alexandru Ionita	UD	6	27 Jul 2024	Palacio Municipal de Deportes Son Moix, Palma de Mallorca, Spain	
12	Win	11–1	Gerson Larios	KO	5 (6)	13 Jul 2024	Pabellon Juan Beltran, Las Palmas, Spain	
11	Win	10–1	Aramis Torres	UD	12	10 Nov 2023	Gran Canaria Arena, Las Palmas, Spain	Won vacant EBU Silver flyweight title.
10	Win	9–1	Anuar Salas	UD	6	16 Sep 2023	Club de Boxa La Cubierta, Badia del Valles, Spain	
9	Loss	8–1	Julio Cesar Martinez	MD	12	3 Dec 2022	Desert Diamond Arena, Glendale, Arizona, U.S.	For WBC flyweight title
8	Win	8–0	Moises Mojica	UD	6	29 Oct 2022	Pabellan Juan Beltran, Las Palmas, Spain	
7	Win	7–0	Joel Cordova	UD	10	1 Apr 2022	Palau Olímpic Vall d'Hebron, Barcelona, Spain	
6	Win	6–0	Luis Fernando Villa	TKO	1 (8)	3 Dec 2021	Bilbao Arena, Bilbao, Spain	
5	Win	5–0	Joel Sanchez	UD	6	18 Jul 2021	Polideportivo Magarinos, Madrid, Spain	
4	Win	4–0	Jose Antonio Jimenez	KO	1 (10), 1:33	1 Feb 2020	Yantarny Sports Palace, Kaliningrad, Russia	Won vacant WBA International flyweight title
3	Win	3–0	Enrique Magsalin	UD	8	21 Dec 2019	Ivan Yarygin Sports Palace, Krasnoyarsk, Russia	
2	Win	2–0	Franklin Flores	KO	2 (4)	19 Oct 2019	Gallera del López Socas, Las Palmas, Spain	
1	Win	1–0	Alejandro Torres	KO	2 (6)	14 Sep 2019	Plaza de Garachico, Guia de Isora, Spain	
