= David Oliver Joyce =

Irish boxer

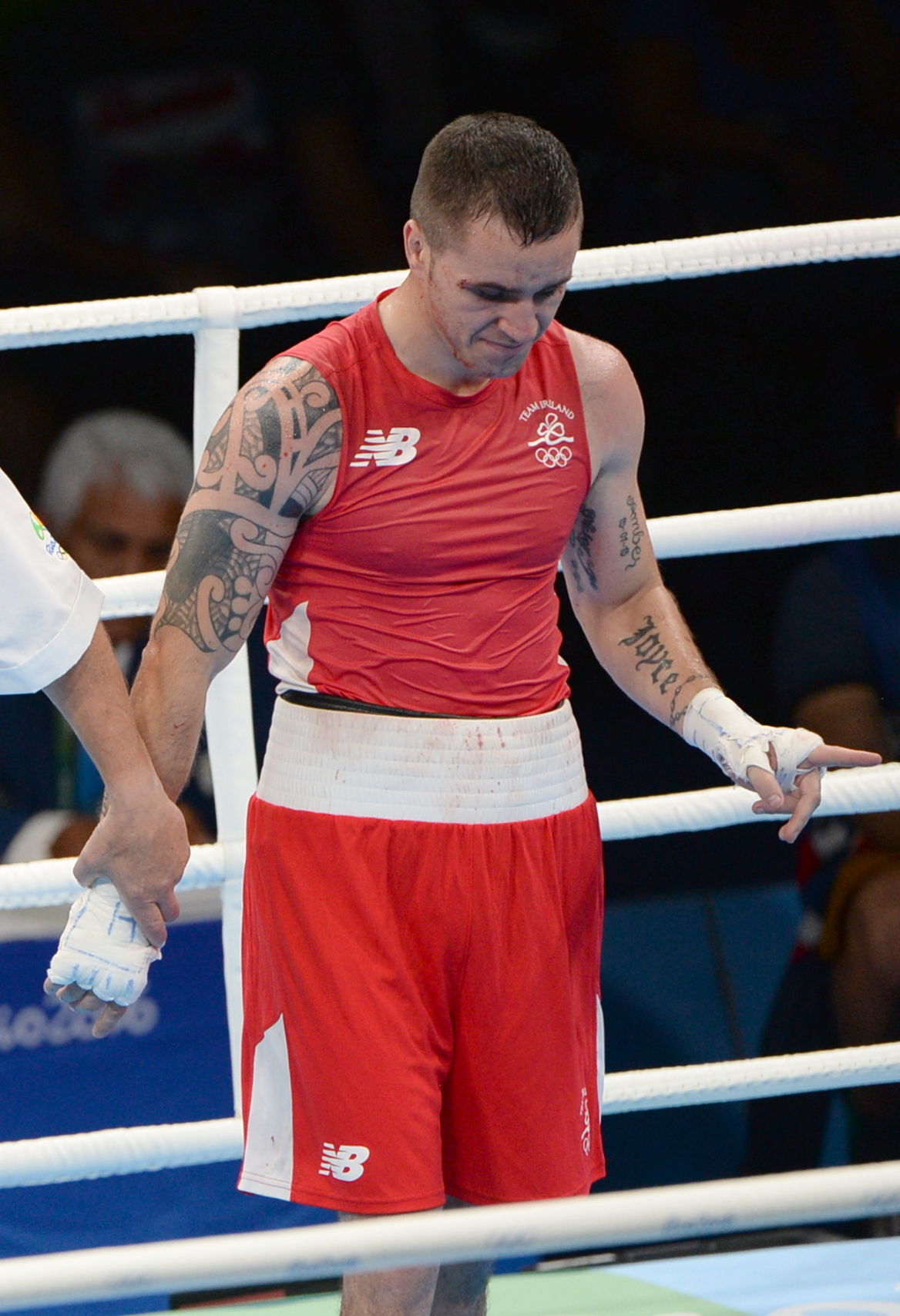
- Joyce at the 2016 Olympics

Personal information
- Nickname: The Punisher
- Nationality: Irish
- Born: 12 February 1987 (age 39) Mullingar, Westmeath, Ireland
- Height: 171 cm (5 ft 7 in)
- Weight: Super-bantamweight; Featherweight; Lightweight

Boxing career
- Reach: 170 cm (67 in)
- Stance: Orthodox

Boxing record
- Total fights: 14
- Wins: 12
- Win by KO: 9
- Losses: 2
Medal record
Representing (Republic of Ireland) Ireland
European Union Championships
Gold medal – first place	2008 Cetniewo	Featherweight
Gold medal – first place	2009 Odense	Featherweight
Gold medal – first place	2014 Sofia	Lightweight

David Oliver Joyce (born 12 February 1987) is an Irish professional boxer. As an amateur, he won gold medals at the 2008, 2009 and 2014 European Union Championships, and competed at the 2016 Summer Olympics.

== Personal life ==
Joyce was born into a boxing family in Mullingar, County Westmeath. His cousins John Joe Joyce and Joe Ward are also international boxers. Joyce is married to Melissa and has three children: Amber, Mickey Joe and Reanna.

== Amateur career ==
In April 2016, he qualified for the 2016 Summer Olympics in Rio de Janeiro, beating Volkan Gockek on points in a fight in Turkey. He reached the last sixteen of the men's lightweight competition, defeating Andrique Allisop in a first round bout by unanimous decision. He was eliminated in the round of 16.

== Professional career ==
Joyce made his professional debut on 7 June 2017, at the Waterfront Hall in Belfast. In a six-round bout against Gabor Kovacs, he won via second round technical knockout (TKO).

== Professional boxing record ==
14 fights	12 wins	2 losses
By knockout	9	2
By decision	3	0

No.	Result	Record	Opponent	Type	Round, time	Date	Location	Notes
14	Loss	12–2	Ionuț Băluță	TKO	3 (10), 1:49	26 Sep 2020	York Hall, London, England	Lost WBO European super-bantamweight title
13	Win	12–1	Lee Haskins	TKO	5 (10), 2:54	1 Feb 2020	Ulster Hall, Belfast, Northern Ireland	Won vacant WBO European super-bantamweight title
12	Loss	11–1	Leigh Wood	TKO	9 (10), 2:23	4 Oct 2019	York Hall, London, England	Lost WBO European featherweight title; The Golden Contract: Featherweight – Quarter-final
11	Win	11–0	Breilor Teran	UD	10	6 Jul 2019	Barys Arena, Nur-Sultan, Kazakhstan	Retained WBO European featherweight title
10	Win	10–0	Stephen Tiffney	TKO	7 (10), 3:00	5 Apr 2019	Emirates Golf Club, Dubai, United Arab Emirates	Won vacant WBO European featherweight title
9	Win	9–0	Jorge Rojas Zacazontetl	UD	6	27 Oct 2018	The Theater at Madison Square Garden, New York City, New York, U.S.	
8	Win	8–0	Arturo Lopez	TKO	6 (8), 1:23	24 Aug 2018	Emirates Arena, Glasgow, Scotland	
7	Win	7–0	Jordan Ellison	TKO	6 (8), 1:43	21 Apr 2018	SSE Arena, Belfast, Northern Ireland	
6	Win	6–0	Lyuben Todorov	TKO	2 (6), 0:29	10 Feb 2018	The Devenish Complex, Belfast, Northern Ireland	
5	Win	5–0	Reynaldo Cajina	RTD	3 (6), 3:00	18 Nov 2017	SSE Arena, Belfast, Northern Ireland	
4	Win	4–0	Andy Harris	TKO	1 (4), 1:43	21 Oct 2017	SSE Arena, Belfast, Northern Ireland	
3	Win	3–0	Ivan Gobor	PTS	6	16 Sep 2017	The Devenish Complex, Belfast, Northern Ireland	
2	Win	2–0	Lesther Cantillano	TKO	3 (6), 2:42	22 Jul 2017	Brentwood Centre, Brentwood, England	
1	Win	1–0	Gabor Kovacs	TKO	2 (6), 2:38	17 Jun 2017	Waterfront Hall, Belfast, Northern Ireland	
