= Lee Ye-chan =

South Korean footballer

Personal information
- Full name: Lee Ye-chan
- Date of birth: 1 May 1996 (age 30)
- Place of birth: South Korea
- Height: 1.70 m (5 ft 7 in)
- Position: Forward

Team information
- Current team: Cheonan City FC

Youth career
- 2012–2014: Daeshin High School

Senior career*
Years	Team	Apps	(Gls)
2015	FC Pocheon		
2016	Goyang Zaicro	37	(1)
2017–2018	Seoul E-Land	33	(0)
2019–2020	Mokpo City	30	(6)
2021-	Cheonan City	45	(7)
2023-2025	→ Seoul Nowon United FC (loan)	21	(5)
- * Club domestic league appearances and goals as of 25 December 2025

Lee Ye-chan (Korean: 이예찬; born 1 May 1996) is a South Korean footballer who plays for Cheonan City FC as a forward.

== Career ==
Lee Ye-chan has joined amateur club FC Pocheon in 2015.

He joined K League Challenge side Goyang Zaicro FC in January 2016.
