= Michael O'Reilly (boxer) =

Irish boxer (born 1993)

Personal information
- Nationality: Irish
- Born: Michael O'Reilly; 30 March 1993 (age 33) Clonmel, Ireland
- Height: 183 cm (6 ft 0 in)
- Weight: Middleweight

Boxing career
Medal record
Representing (Republic of Ireland) Ireland
World Amateur Championships
Bronze medal – third place	2015 Doha	Middleweight
European Games
Gold medal – first place	2015 Baku	Middleweight

Michael O'Reilly (born 30 March 1993) is an Irish amateur boxer from Portlaoise.

== Career ==
O'Reilly is part of Portlaoise Boxing Club. He competes at middleweight. O'Reilly's first major international tournament was the 2015 European Games in Baku, where he won the gold medal by beating local favourite Xaybula Musalov in the final. That qualified O'Reilly for the 2015 AIBA World Boxing Championships where he won bronze.

In 2016, O'Reilly qualified to represent Ireland for the Rio Olympics at the AIBA World Olympic Qualifying Tournament in Baku. On 4 August 2016, on the eve of the Olympics Opening Ceremony, O'Reilly was suspended after a sample provided prior to his travel to Rio tested positive for a banned substance. On 9 August O'Reilly released a statement in which he admitted unintentionally taking a banned supplement prior to the Games.
