= Kamran Shakhsuvarly =

Azerbaijani boxer (born 1992)

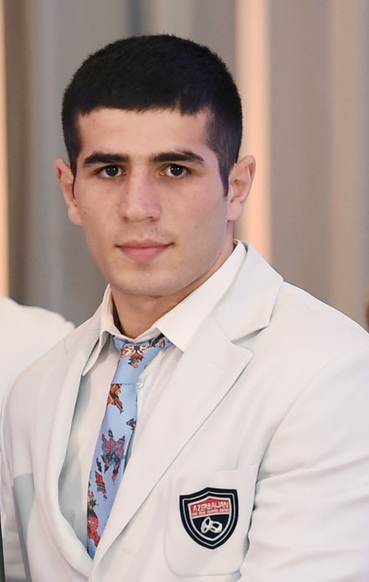
- Kamran Shakhsuvarly in 2016

Personal information
- Nationality: Azerbaijani
- Born: Kamran Nemat oglu Shakhsuvarly; 6 December 1992 (age 33)
- Height: 1.80 m (5 ft 11 in)
- Weight: Middleweight

Boxing career
Medal record
Olympic Games
| Bronze medal – third place | 2016 Rio de Janeiro | Middleweight |
World Championships
| Bronze medal – third place | 2017 Hamburg | Middleweight |
European Championships
| Silver medal – second place | 2017 Kharkiv | Middleweight |
Islamic Solidarity Games
| Silver medal – second place | 2017 Baku | Middleweight |

Kamran Shakhsuvarly (Azerbaijani: Kamran Şahsuvarlı; born 6 December 1992) is an Azerbaijani boxer. He won a bronze medal in the men's middleweight event at the 2016 Summer Olympics.
