= Tomášikovo =

Tomášikovo Tallós
- Municipality
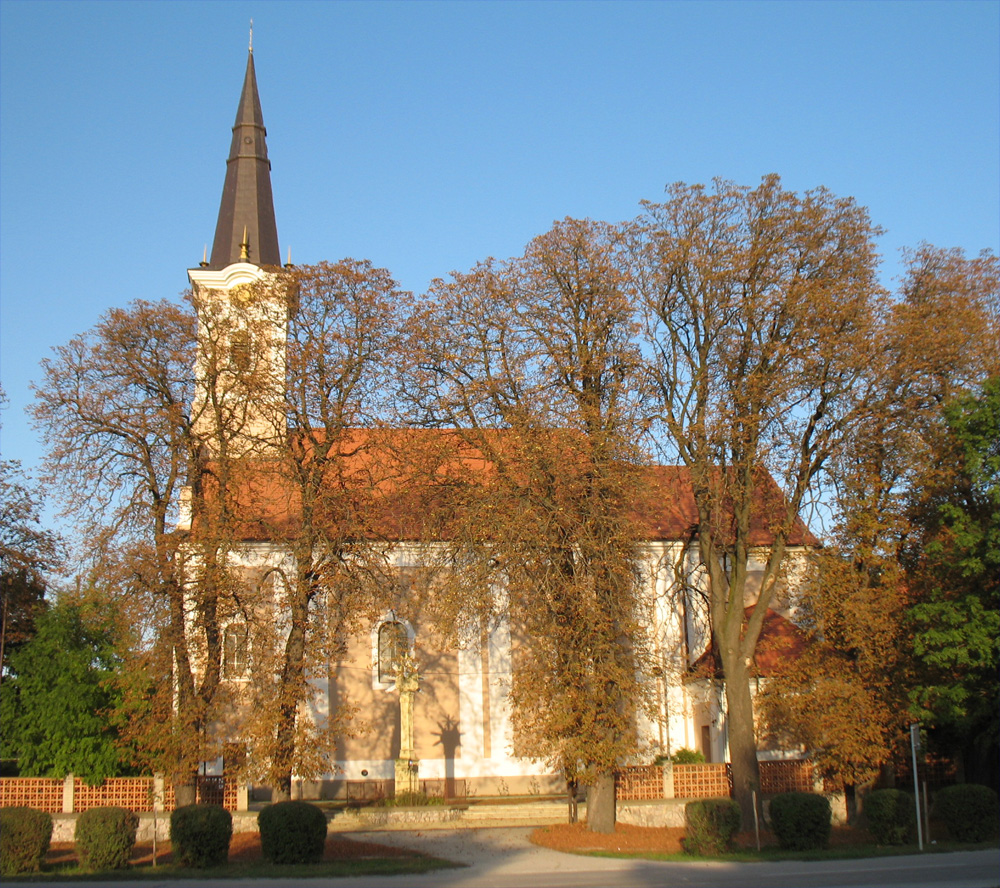
- Catholic church

- Flag

- Location of Tomášikovo in the Trnava Region Location of Tomášikovo in Slovakia
- Coordinates: 48.08°N 17.69°E
- Country: Slovakia
- Region: Trnava Region
- District: Galanta District
- First mentioned: 1646
- Named for: Samuel Tomášik

Government
  - Mayor: Zoltán Horváth (Puma)

Area
  - Total: 21.13 km^{2} (8.16 sq mi)
- Elevation: 114 m (374 ft)

Population (2025)
  - Total: 1,824
- Time zone: UTC+1 (CET)
  - Summer (DST): UTC+2 (CEST)
- Postal code: 925 04
- Area code: +421 31
- Vehicle registration plate (until 2022): GA
- Website: www.tomasikovo.sk

Tomášikovo (Hungarian: Tallós) is a village and municipality in Galanta District of the Trnava Region of south-west Slovakia.

== Geography ==
The municipality lies at an altitude of 114 metres (374 ft) and covers an area of 21.13 km^{2} (8.16 sq mi) (2025).

== Population ==
Population statistic (10 years)
Year	1995	2005	2015	2025
Count	1492	1591	1654	1824
Difference		+6.63%	+3.95%	+10.27%

Population statistic
Year	2024	2025
Count	1805	1824
Difference		+1.05%

It has a population of 1824 people (31 December 2025).

=== Ethnicity ===
Census 2021 (1+ %)
Ethnicity	Number	Fraction
Hungarian	1290	74.3%
Slovak	347	19.98%
Not found out	169	9.73%
Romani	132	7.6%
Total	1736	

In year 2021 was 1736 people by ethnicity 1290 as Hungarian, 347 as Slovak, 169 as Not found out, 132 as Romani, 6 as Czech, 1 as Ukrainian and 1 as Other.

Note on population: The difference values of population numbers in the table "Population statistic" and in the sections "Ethnicity" & "Religion" is caused by the use of various statistical methods.

=== Religion ===
Census 2021 (1+ %)
Religion	Number	Fraction
Roman Catholic Church	1196	68.89%
None	317	18.26%
Not found out	162	9.33%
Total	1736	

In year 2021 was 1736 people by religion 1196 from Roman Catholic Church, 317 from None, 162 from Not found out, 17 from Evangelical Church, 13 from Christian Congregations in Slovakia, 11 from Calvinist Church, 7 from Greek Catholic Church, 5 from Apostolic Church, 3 from United Methodist Church, 2 from Buddhism, 1 from Other and not ascertained christian church, 1 from Other and 1 from Hinduism.

== History ==
In the 9th century, the territory of Tallós became part of the Kingdom of Hungary. In historical records the village was first mentioned in 1646. Before the establishment of independent Czechoslovakia in 1918, it was part of Pozsony County. After the Austro-Hungarian army disintegrated in November 1918, Czechoslovak troops occupied the area, later acknowledged internationally by the Treaty of Trianon. Between 1938 and 1945 Tallós once more became part of Miklós Horthy's Hungary through the First Vienna Award. From 1945 until the Velvet Divorce, it was part of Czechoslovakia. Since then it has been part of Slovakia.

== Notable people ==
- Viliam Tankó (born 1995) - boxer and politician
