= Darren O'Neill =

Irish boxer

Personal information
- Born: 13 September 1985 (age 40) Paulstown, Kilkenny, Ireland
- Height: 184 cm (6 ft 0 in)
- Weight: 75 kg (165 lb)

Boxing career
- Weight class: Light-heavyweight
Medal record
Men's amateur boxing
Representing Ireland
World Golden Gloves Championships
Gold medal – first place	2013 Waldorf	Light-heavyweight
European Championships
Silver medal – second place	2010 Moscow	Middleweight
EU Championships
Gold medal – first place	2009 Odense	Middleweight
Silver medal – second place	2014 Sofia	Light-heavyweight

Darren O'Neill (born 13 September 1985) is an Irish amateur boxer. He won a gold medal at the 2009 EU Championships, and silver at the 2010 European Championships and 2014 EU Championships. He also captained Ireland's boxers at the 2012 Summer Olympics in London.

== Boxing ==
O'Neill claimed all honours around him in Ireland at underage levels, as well as playing for Kilkenny U-21 hurling team. He finished second at light-heavyweight at the National Championships 2005 and 2006 behind Kenneth Egan. O'Neill has since won four national middleweight championships and two heavyweight championships where he has excelled. He lost to Darren Sutherland on a close decision in 2008. He also lost out on a chance to compete at an Olympic qualifier to Sutherland in an IABA box-off. O'Neill was also 2009 European Union champion and 2010 European silver medalist. In the 2010 European championships he defeated four opponents including medal favourite Sergey Derevyanchenko of Ukraine before losing to Artem Chebotarev of Russia in the final. He was named the captain of the Irish boxing team at the 2011 European Championships. He secured automatic Olympic qualification for the 2012 London games in the World Amateur Championships 2011. At the 2012 Summer Olympics in London he again captained the Irish boxing team, but went out in the last 16 to Stefan Härtel. He bore the flag for Ireland at the 2012 Summer Olympics closing ceremony. By 2015, he had moved up to heavyweight, reaching the Irish final.

In July 2019 he announced his decision to turn professional.

== See also ==
RTE's collection of O'Neill articles - https://www.rte.ie/sport/search/?q=darren%20o'neill
