= Pavel Kastramin =

Belarusian boxer (born 1991)

Pavel Kastramin (born 12 July 1991) is a boxer from Belarus. He represented Belarus at the 2016 Summer Olympics in the men's welterweight, where he lost to Sailom Adi of Thailand in the first round by split decision.
