= Arslanbek Açilow =

Turkmen boxer (born 1993)

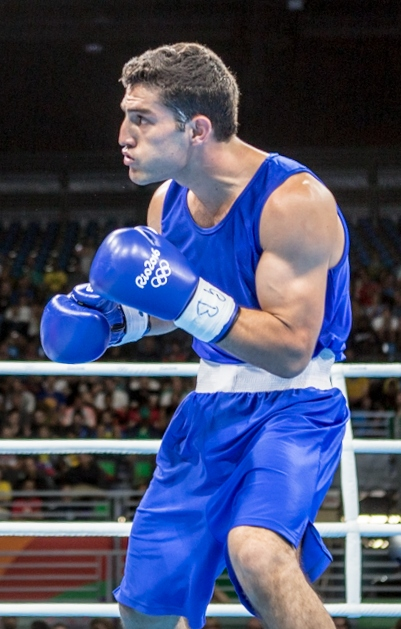
- Achilov at the 2016 Summer Olympics

Personal information
- Born: 1 July 1993 (age 33) Chardzhou, Turkmenistan
- Education: National Institute of Sports and Tourism of Turkmenistan
- Height: 177 cm (5 ft 10 in)

Sport
- Sport: Amateur boxing
- Coached by: Shokhrat Kurbanov

Arslanbek Açilow (born 1 July 1993) is a Turkmen boxer who competed in the middleweight division. He competed in the 2016 Olympics, but was eliminated in the first round. His elder brother Aziz is also an international boxer.
