= Viliam Tankó =

Slovak boxer and politician

- Born: 17 May 1995 (age 31); Tomášikovo, Slovakia

Member of the National Council
- Incumbent
- Assumed office 15 October 2023

Personal details
- Party: Ordinary People and Independent Personalities (2023–2024); Progressive Slovakia (since 2024)
- Sports career
- Sport: Boxing
Medal record
Men's amateur boxing
Representing Slovakia
European Games
Bronze medal – third place	2015 Baku	Men's 52 kg

Viliam Tankó (born 17 May 1995) is a Slovak boxer and politician. Since 2023 he has served as an MP of the National Council of Slovakia.

== Biography ==
Viliam Tankó was born on 17 May 1995 in the village of Tomášikovo, nearby the town of Galanta. He is of Romani ethnicity. Following the divorce of his parents, he was raised by an impoverished single mother, living together with his three siblings in a small cottage with broken windows and no running water. He started boxing as an eight-year-old. His talent was noticed by the boxers Ladislav Karacsóny and Tomáš Kovács, who took young Viliam under their wings and helped to him to become a boxer in Galanta.

After graduating from high school, Tankó enrolled at the Police Academy. Nonetheless, he later abandoned his studies to focus on his boxing career. As of 2023 he studies social work at the Constantine the Philosopher University in Nitra.

== Boxing career ==
Tankó participated at the Youth and Junior World Boxing Championships in 2011 and 2013 and Youth European Championship in 2013. He won bronze medals at the 2014 European Union Amateur Boxing Championships in Sofia and 2015 European Games in Baku. He also competed at the 2019 European Games in Minsk and 2023 European Games in Kraków, finishing respectively unranked and ninth.

In July 2023, Tankó was involved in an incident at the Fight Night Challenge tournament in Bratislava. Aggravated by what he saw as poor referring, he jumped into the ring and kicked the boxer Pavol Vaško. He later apologized for his behavior.

== Political career ==
In the 2023 Slovak parliamentary election Tankó won a seat in the parliament on the list of Ordinary People and Independent Personalities (OĽaNO) party.

While campaigning before the election, a bar in Spišská Nová Ves refused to serve Tankó, his pregnant partner and Romani OĽaNO MP Peter Pollák coffee because of their race. The racist conduct of the bar staff resulted in a widespread condemnation.

As na MP, Tankó faced criticism from his party, when he praised the creation of the new Sports and Tourism ministry, which his party opposed. Tankó received support from the former OĽaNO MP and tennis player Karol Kučera, who said its important to seek support for sport from all possible sources.

In August 2024, he announce he has left his party and remain in the National Council as an independent MP. In October 2024, Tankó joined the Progressive Slovakia party.

== Personal life ==
Tankó has been in a relationship with the 2023 Miss Universe pageant contestant Vanessa Gáborová since 2020. In July 2023 they announced they expected their first baby.
