= Mikhail Dauhaliavets =

Belarusian boxer (born 1990)

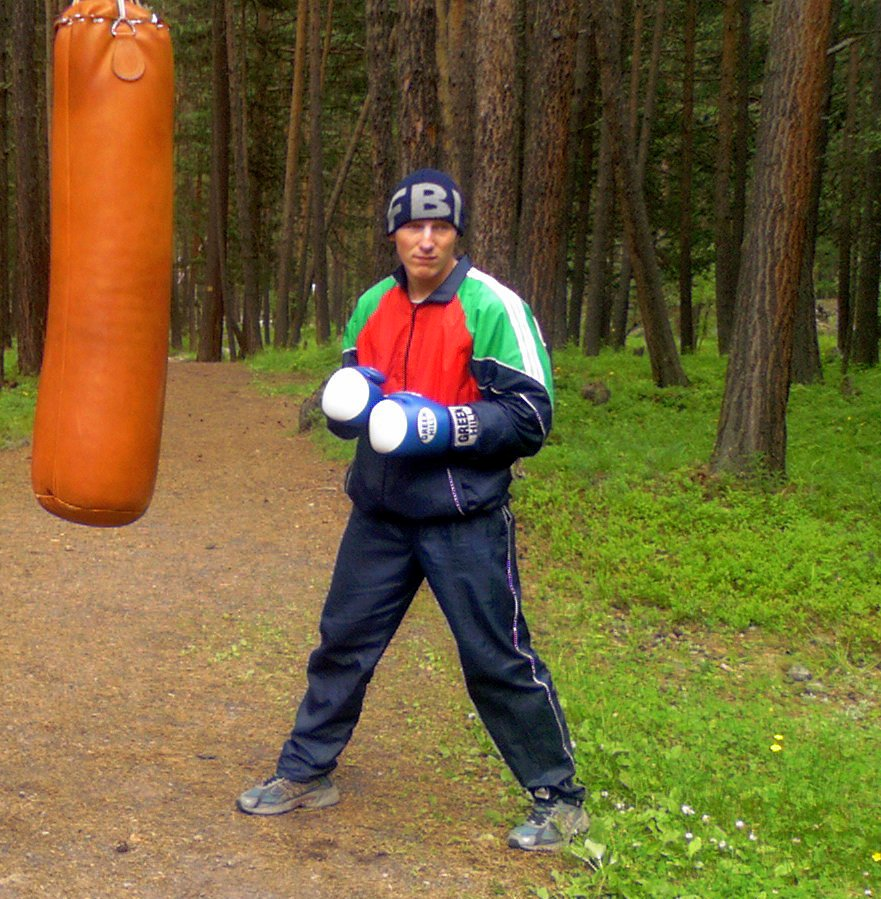
- Dauhaliavets in training

Medal record

Men's amateur boxing

Representing Belarus

European Junior Championships
| Bronze medal – third place | 2006 | Light heavyweight |

CISM Championships
| Silver medal – second place | 2008 | Light heavyweight |

Mikhail Dauhaliavets (born 18 May 1990 in Minsk, Belarusian SSR) is a Belarusian boxer. At the 2012 Summer Olympics, he competed in the Men's light heavyweight, but was defeated in the first round by Oleksandr Hvozdyk. He also competed in the same weight division at the 2016 Summer Olympics. He beat Valentino Manfredonia before losing to eventual silver medalist Adilbek Niyazymbetov.
