= Enrico Lacruz =

Dutch boxer (born 1993)

Personal information
- Born: 31 August 1993 (age 32) Arnhem, Netherlands

Boxing career
Medal record
Men's amateur boxing
Representing Netherlands
European Games
Bronze medal – third place	2019 Minsk	Light-welterweight
European Championships
Bronze medal – third place	2015 Samokov	Lightweight

Enrico Lacruz (born 31 August 1993) is a Dutch boxer. He competed in the men's lightweight event at the 2016 Summer Olympics. He defeated Lai Chu-en of Chinese Taipei in his first fight before losing to Dorjnyambuugiin Otgondalai of Mongolia.

In 2016, prior to the Rio 2016 Olympics, Enrico Lacruz won a gold medal in the Eindhoven Box Cup 2016 in the Netherlands. In the quarterfinals he won against Yasin Yilmaz (Turkey) by unanimous decision. In the semi-finals he saw another unanimous win over Igor Lazarev (Israel). In the final La Cruz won his third straight unanimous decision in this tournament over Uganda's national champion Sula Segawa.
