= Sumit Sangwan =

Indian boxer (born 1993)

Personal information
- Nationality: Indian
- Born: 1 January 1993 (age 33) Shekhpura village, Karnal district, Haryana, India
- Occupation: Sportsman

Sport
- Sport: Boxing
- Event: asian championship 2017 silver
- Club: Bhiwani Boxing Club

Sumit Sangwan (born 1 January 1993) is an Indian amateur boxer.

At the 2012 London Olympics, he participated in the light heavyweight category. Under controversial circumstances, he lost his bout to Yamaguchi Falcão Florentino.

He is supported by Olympic Gold Quest.

== Early life and career ==
Sangwan was born on 1 January 1993 in Shekhpura village of Haryana state's Karnal district to a Jat family. He started his career at avery early age, picking up the gloves when he was only 11, at his uncle's boxing academy in the village. He soon showed his mettle and went from the state levels to the national levels when he was only 16. After shining through the national levels by winning two gold medals, he came to the spotlight when he won the Gold at the Asian Olympic Qualifiers in Astana, Kazakhstan in April 2012. He kept the faith of the national selectors when he qualified for the London Olympics after he was picked for the Olympic qualifiers over 2010 Asian Games silver medalist and Olympian Dinesh Kumar.

Sumit Sangwan represented India in the AIBA World Boxing Championships in Almaty Kazakhstan. He lost out to Adilbek Niyazymbetov of Kazakhstan in the quarterfinals of the World Boxing Championships.

Sumit participated in the World Series of Boxing for American outfit USA Knockouts in 2014.
