= Shan Jun =

Chinese boxer

Shan Jun 山俊
Personal information
- Nationality: Chinese
- Born: August 7, 1994 (age 31) Luliang, Yunnan
- Height: 1.72 m (5 ft 8 in)
- Weight: 64 kg (141 lb)

Boxing career
Medal record
Men's amateur boxing
Representing China
Asian Games
| Bronze medal – third place | 2018 Jakarta-Palembang | Lightweight |
Asian Championships
| Bronze medal – third place | 2017 Tashkent | Lightweight |

Shan Jun
- Traditional Chinese: 山俊
- Simplified Chinese: 山俊
Transcriptions
Standard Mandarin
- Hanyu Pinyin: Shān Jùn

Shan Jun (Chinese: 山俊; pinyin: Shān Jùn; born 7 August 1994 in Luliang, Yunnan) is a Chinese lightweight boxer. He won the bronze medalist at Olympic Qualifying Tournament in June 2016 in Baku, Azerbaijan, qualifying for the Rio 2016 Olympics.

== Career ==
Born in Xiaobaihu town (小白户镇), Luliang county, Yunnan province, When Shan was a preteen, his brother and he went to Qujing Sports School, he practised boxing and his brother did sprint running there. At his age of 15, he won the champion in a teenagers boxing match held by Kunming Sports Federation in 2009, soon afterwards he was a member of Yunnan provincial boxing Team. Although his boxing skills were so-so in the early days after being a member there, he got more and more excellent than the other exercisers because of his hard working to practise boxing. he won the 3rd in the National youth competition, It was that he firstly took part in national events, in the next year he won the gold medal in the National youth competition.
