= Balázs Bacskai =

Hungarian boxer (born 1988)

Personal information
- Nickname: Benji
- Nationality: Hungarian
- Born: Imre Balázs Bacskai; 29 January 1988 (age 38) Budapest, Hungary
- Height: 177 cm (5 ft 10 in)
- Weight: Super-welterweight; Middleweight

Boxing career
- Stance: orthodox

Boxing record
- Total fights: 14
- Wins: 14
- Win by KO: 8
- Losses: 0
- Draws: 0
- No contests: 0
Medal record
European Amateur Championships
Gold medal – first place	2010 Moscow	Welterweight

Imre Balázs Bacskai (born 29 January 1988) is a Hungarian professional boxer who has held the WBO Inter-Continental super-welterweight title since 2020. As an amateur, he competed at the 2016 Summer Olympics in the men's welterweight event, in which he was eliminated in the round of 32 by Souleymane Cissokho.

== Professional career ==
He made his professional debut on 10 June 2017, defeating former amateur teammate Norbert Harcsa by unanimous decision to capture the vacant Hungarian middleweight title.

== Professional boxing record ==
14 fights	14 wins	0 losses
By knockout	8	0
By decision	6	0

No.	Result	Record	Opponent	Type	Round, time	Date	Location	Notes
14	Win	14–0	(Germany) Nick Klappert	TKO	2 (10), 1:58	11 Dec 2020	Amalia Sterbinszky Vasas Sports Hall, Budapest, Hungary	Won vacant WBO Inter-Continental super-welterweight title
13	Win	13–0	(Austria) Gogi Knezevic	KO	2 (8), 0:48	11 Sep 2020	Arena Shopping Center, Budapest, Hungary	
12	Win	12–0	(Russia) Aleksei Evchenko	UD	10	12 Oct 2019	Sporthall, Salgótarján, Hungary	
11	Win	11–0	(Brazil) Davi Eliasquevici	PTS	8	18 May 2019	(United Kingdom) Lamex Stadium, Stevenage, England	
10	Win	10–0	(Bosnia and Herzegovina) Senad Karic	KO	1 (6), 1:43	27 Apr 2019	Lake Side Hotel, Székesfehérvár, Hungary	
9	Win	9–0	(Belgium) Islam Teffahi	KO	3 (8), 1:41	14 Dec 2018	Sporthall Lang, Budapest, Hungary	
8	Win	8–0	(South Africa) Nkululeko Mhlongo	UD	8	14 Sep 2018	Kalaszi Sporthall, Budakalász, Hungary	
7	Win	7–0	(Venezuela) Jean Carlos Prada	TKO	3 (10), 2:10	2 Jun 2018	Thury Castle, Várpalota, Hungary	
6	Win	6–0	(Ukraine) Dmytro Semernin	TKO	3 (8), 1:39	13 Apr 2018	Trade Center, Oradea, Romania	
5	Win	5–0	(Tanzania) Meshack Mwankemwa	TKO	6 (8), 2:35	16 Feb 2018	Sporthall Budakalász, Budakalász, Hungary	
4	Win	4–0	(Italy) Alex Marongiu	UD	8	15 Dec 2017	Lake Side Hotel, Székesfehérvár, Hungary	
3	Win	3–0	(Tanzania) Joseph Sinkala	UD	6	10 Nov 2017	City Hall, Salgótarján, Hungary	
2	Win	2–0	(Georgia (country)) Lasha Gurguliani	TKO	4 (6), 2:16	15 Sep 2017	Castle of Várpalota, Várpalota, Hungary	
1	Win	1–0	(Hungary) Norbert Harcsa	UD	10	10 Jun 2017	Sporthall Budakalász, Budakalász, Hungary	Won vacant Hungarian middleweight title
