= Arashi Morisaka =

Japanese boxer (born 1996)

Personal information
- Born: 2 June 1996 (age 30) Osaka, Japan

Boxing career

Arashi Morisaka (森坂 嵐, Morisaka Arashi; born 2 June 1996) is a Japanese boxer. He competed in the men's bantamweight event at the 2016 Summer Olympics. He was eliminated in the round of 32.
