= Simeon Chamov =

Bulgarian boxer (born 1990)

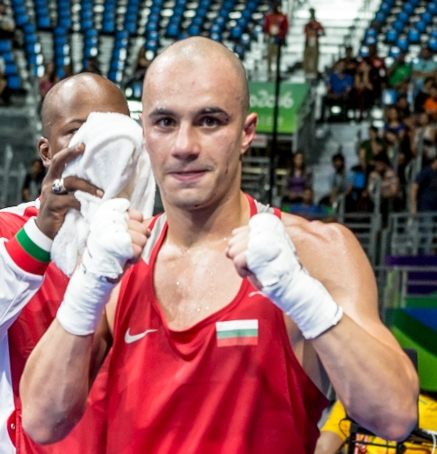
- Chamov at the 2016 Olympics

Personal information
- Born: 24 December 1990 (age 35)
- Height: 180 cm (5 ft 11 in)

Sport
- Sport: Amateur boxing
- Club: CSKA Sofia
- Coached by: Mihail Takov

Simeon Chamov (Bulgarian: Симеон Чамов, born 24 December 1990) is a Bulgarian boxer. He competed in the welterweight division at the 2016 Summer Olympics, but was eliminated in the second bout. His father is a former international boxer.
