= Souleymane Cissokho =

Senegalese-born French boxer (born 1991)

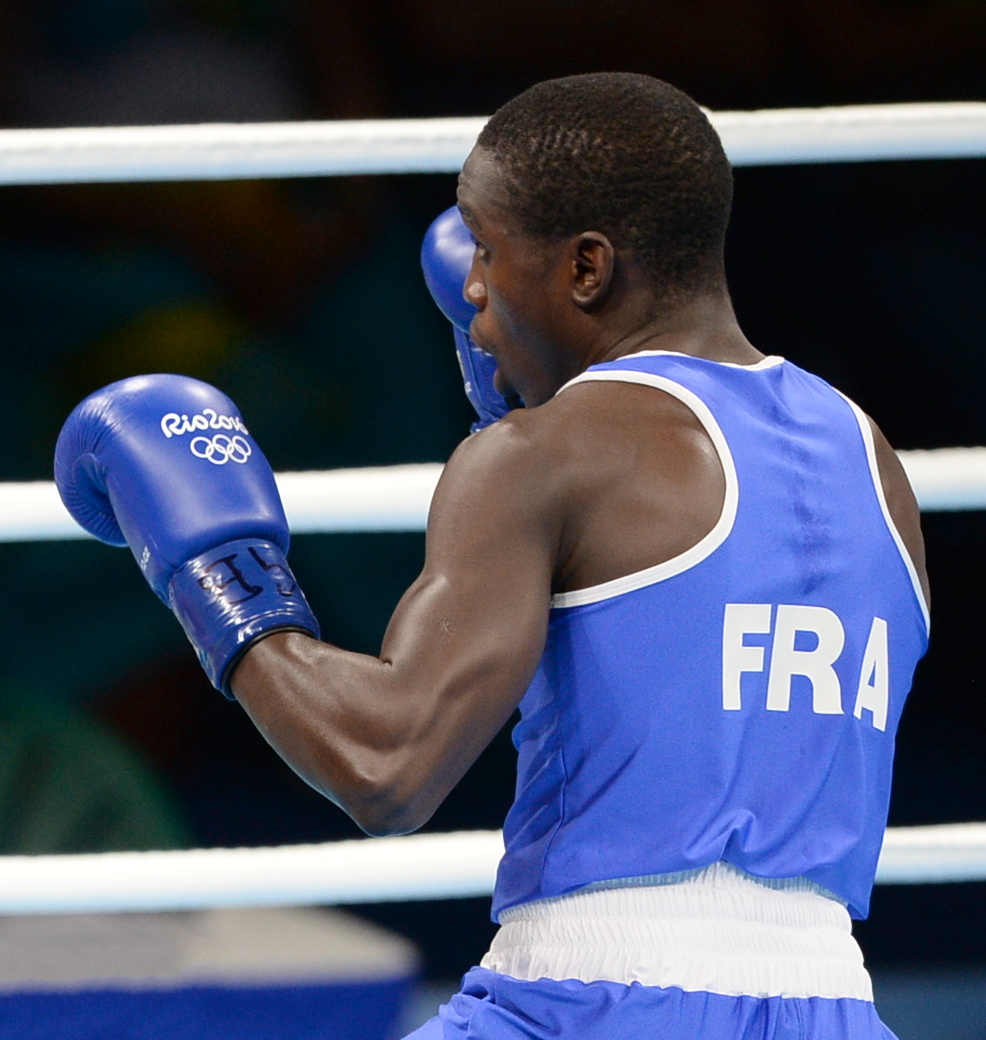
- Cissokho at the 2016 Summer Olympics.

Personal information
- Nationality: French
- Born: 4 July 1991 (age 35) Dakar, Senegal
- Height: 5 ft 10 1/2 in (179 cm)
- Weight: Light-middleweight

Boxing career
- Reach: 70 1/2 in (179 cm)
- Stance: Orthodox

Boxing record
- Total fights: 18
- Wins: 18
- Win by KO: 9
- Losses: 0
Medal record
Men's amateur boxing
Representing France
Olympic Games
Bronze medal – third place	2016 Rio de Janeiro	Welterweight

Souleymane Diop Cissokho (born 4 July 1991) is a Senegal-born French professional boxer. As an amateur he won a bronze medal at the 2016 Summer Olympics.

== Professional boxing record ==
18 fights	18 wins	0 losses
By knockout	9	0
By decision	9	0

No.	Result	Record	Opponent	Type	Round, time	Date	Location	Notes
18	Win	18–0	(Lithuania) Egidijus Kavaliauskas	UD	12	10 May 2025	Centre de Conférence de Sipopo, Malabo, Equatorial Guinea	Retained WBC Silver welterweight title
17	Win	17–0	(Mexico) Isaias Lucero	UD	12	4 Nov 2023	Casino de Monte Carlo Salle Medecin, Monte Carlo, Monaco	Retained WBC Silver welterweight title
16	Win	16–0	(South Africa) Tulani Mbenge	MD	12	17 Dec 2022	Parc des Expositions, Nantes, France	Won vacant WBC Silver welterweight title
15	Win	15–0	(Mexico) Roberto Valenzuela Jr	UD	10	5 Mar 2022	(United States) Pechanga Arena, San Diego, California, U.S.	Retained WBA Inter-Continental super-welterweight title
14	Win	14–0	(Russia) Ismail Iliev	TKO	5 (10), 3:00	10 Sep 2021	Stade Roland Garros, Paris, France	Retained WBA Inter-Continental super-welterweight title
13	Win	13–0	(United Kingdom) Kieron Conway	SD	10	8 May 2021	(United States) AT&T Stadium, Arlington, Texas, US	Won WBA Inter-Continental super-welterweight title
12	Win	12–0	(Mexico) Daniel Echeverria	TKO	6 (8), 1:30	13 Mar 2021	(United States) American Airlines Center, Dallas, Texas, US	
11	Win	11–0	(Russia) Dmitry Mikhaylenko	UD	10	28 Sep 2019	H Arena, Nantes, France	
10	Win	10–0	(Argentina) Jose Carlos Paz	KO	5 (10), 2:53	13 Jul 2019	Azur Arena, Antibes, France	
9	Win	9–0	(Mexico) Vladimir Hernández	UD	8	1 Jun 2019	(United States) Madison Square Garden, New York City, New York, US	
8	Win	8–0	(France) Romain Garofalo	TKO	3 (10), 2:03	9 Feb 2019	Dôme de Paris, Paris, France	Won vacant French super-welterweight title
7	Win	7–0	(Mexico) Carlos Molina	UD	10	23 Jun 2018	Dôme de Paris, Paris, France	
6	Win	6–0	(Mexico) Jose de Jesus Macias	UD	10	7 Apr 2018	Dôme de Paris, Paris, France	
5	Win	5–0	(Mexico) Daniel Cota	KO	5 (8), 2:33	10 Mar 2018	La Seine Musicale, Paris, France	
4	Win	4–0	(Spain) Jose Clavero	TKO	7 (8), 2:55	16 Dec 2017	La Seine Musicale, Paris, France	
3	Win	3–0	(Ukraine) Dmytro Semernin	KO	1 (8), 2:42	14 Oct 2017	Zénith Paris, Paris, France	
2	Win	2–0	(Georgia (country)) Giorgi Kerdikoshvili	TKO	3 (6), 2:28	2 Jun 2017	Palais des Sports Porte de Versailles, Paris, France	
1	Win	1–0	(Hungary) Renato Goman	KO	1 (6), 2:18	21 Jan 2017	Palais des sports Marcel-Cerdan, Paris, France	
