= Boxing at the 2016 Summer Olympics – Qualification =

Qualification for the boxing events at the 2016 Summer Olympics is based on the APB and WSB World Rankings, APB and WSB World and Olympic Qualifier, the 2015 World Championships, and the 2016 World Olympic Qualifying Tournament. For the women's events, qualification is based only on the 2016 Women's World Championships. For both men and women, each boxer is selected to compete for the Games through the four Continental Olympic Qualifying Tournaments to be held in 2016.

== Summary ==
NOC	Men										Women			Total
NOC	49	52	56	60	64	69	75	81	91	+91	51	60	75	Total
Algeria		X	X	X	X	X	X	X	X					8
Argentina	X	X	X	X	X	X			X					7
Armenia	X	X	X		X	X								5
Australia							X		X			X		3
Azerbaijan	X	X	X	X	X	X	X	X	X	X		X		11
Belarus			X			X		X						3
Brazil	X	X	X	X	X			X	X			X	X	9
Bulgaria		X				X					X			3
Cameroon	X				X		X	X						4
Canada					X						X		X	3
Cape Verde										X				1
Central African Republic											X			1
China	X	X	X	X	X	X	X		X		X	X	X	11
Colombia	X	X					X	X			X			5
Republic of the Congo					X		X							2
Croatia								X		X				2
Cuba	X	X	X	X	X	X	X	X	X	X				10
Dominican Republic		X	X											2
Ecuador	X						X	X	X					4
Egypt				X		X	X	X						4
Federated States of Micronesia												X		1
Fiji						X								1
Finland												X		1
France		X	X	X	X	X	X	X	X	X	X	X		11
Germany		X			X	X		X	X	X				6
Ghana			X											1
Great Britain	X	X	X	X	X	X	X	X	X	X	X		X	12
Haiti					X									1
Honduras				X										1
Hungary						X	X							2
India			X		X		X							3
Iran								X						1
Iraq							X							1
Ireland	X	X	X	X		X	X	X				X		8
Italy	X			X		X		X	X	X		X		7
Japan			X	X										2
Jordan					X					X				2
Kazakhstan	X	X	X	X	X	X	X	X	X	X	X		X	12
Kenya	X		X			X								3
Kyrgyzstan								X						1
South Korea			X											1
Lesotho		X	X											2
Lithuania					X	X								2
Mauritius							X		X					2
Mexico	X	X		X	X	X	X							6
Mongolia	X	X	X	X	X	X								6
Morocco		X	X			X		X		X	X	X	X	8
Namibia	X				X									2
Netherlands				X				X					X	3
Nigeria										X				1
Panama													X	1
Papua New Guinea				X										1
Philippines	X			X										2
Poland							X		X					2
Puerto Rico		X												1
Qatar				X	X									2
Romania										X				1
Russia	X	X	X	X	X	X	X	X	X			X	X	11
Seychelles				X										1
Spain	X					X								2
Sweden													X	1
Chinese Taipei				X									X	2
Tajikistan				X										1
Thailand			X	X	X	X					X			5
Trinidad and Tobago										X				1
Tunisia			X						X					2
Turkey		X			X	X	X	X		X				6
Turkmenistan							X							1
Uganda		X						X						2
Ukraine			X		X		X	X			X			5
United States	X	X	X	X	X		X					X	X	8
Uzbekistan	X	X	X	X	X	X	X	X	X	X	X			11
Vanuatu			X											1
Venezuela		X	X	X	X	X	X	X		X				8
Virgin Islands										X				1
Zambia							X							1
Total: 76 NOCs	22	26	28	28	28	28	28	26	18	18	12	12	12	286

== Timeline ==
Event	Date	Venue
AIBA Pro Boxing (APB) World Rankings	October 24, 2014 – September 19, 2015	Various cities
World Series of Boxing (WSB) World Rankings	January 15 – June 13, 2015	Various cities
2015 AIBA World Boxing Championships	October 5–15, 2015	Doha, Qatar
Olympic Qualifying Event – America	March 11–19, 2016	Buenos Aires, Argentina
Olympic Qualifying Event – Africa	March 11–19, 2016	Yaoundé, Cameroon
Olympic Qualifying Event – Asia & Oceania	March 25 – April 2, 2016	Qian'an, China
Olympic Qualifying Event – Europe	April 9–17, 2016	Samsun, Turkey
2016 AIBA Women's World Boxing Championships	May 19–27, 2016	Astana, Kazakhstan
2016 AIBA World Olympic Qualifying Tournament	June 16–25, 2016	Baku, Azerbaijan
2016 APB and WSB Olympic Qualifier	July 3–8, 2016	Vargas, Venezuela

== Men's events ==
Olympic qualification system per continent and by weight category.

Weight	WSB Rankings	APB Rankings	WC 2015	Continental Qualifier				APB & WSB 2016	AOB 2016	Host Country	TCI Places	Total Quota
Weight	WSB Rankings	APB Rankings	WC 2015	Africa	America	AS & OC	Europe	APB & WSB 2016	AOB 2016	Host Country	TCI Places	Total Quota
49 kg	1	2	2	3	2	3	3	3	2	1	0	22
52 kg	2	2	2	3	2	3	3	3	5	1	0	26
56 kg	2	2	3	3	2	3	3	3	5	1	1	28
60 kg	2	2	3	3	3	3	3	3	5	0	1	28
64 kg	2	2	3	3	2	3	3	3	5	1	1	28
69 kg	2	2	3	3	3	3	3	3	5	0	1	28
75 kg	2	2	3	3	3	3	3	3	5	0	1	28
81 kg	2	2	2	3	2	3	3	3	5	1	0	26
91 kg	1	2	1	3	3	3	3	1	1	0	0	18
+91 kg	1	2	1	3	3	3	3	1	1	0	0	18
Total	17	20	23	30	25*	30	30	26	39	5	5	250

* The number of quotas for America includes the five host country places subtracted.

=== Light flyweight (49 kg) ===
Competition	Places	Qualified boxer
Host Country	1	Patrick Lourenço (BRA)
WSB Individual World Rankings	1	Paddy Barnes (IRL)
AIBA Pro Boxing (APB) World Rankings	2	Lü Bin (CHN); Birzhan Zhakypov (KAZ)
2015 World Amateur Boxing Championships	2	Vasily Yegorov (RUS); Joahnys Argilagos (CUB)
Olympic Qualifying Event – Africa	3	Simplice Fotsala (CMR); Mathias Hamunyela (NAM); Peter Mungai Warui (KEN)^{[d]}
Olympic Qualifying Event – America	2	Yuberjen Martinez (COL); Nico Hernández (USA)
Olympic Qualifying Event – Asia/Oceania	3	Rogen Ladon (PHI); Hasanboy Dusmatov (UZB); Gankhuyagiin Gan-Erdene (MGL)
Olympic Qualifying Event – Europe	3	Artur Hovhannisyan (ARM); Galal Yafai (GBR); Manuel Cappai (ITA)
2016 AIBA World Olympic Qualifying Tournament	2	Samuel Carmona (ESP); Rufat Huseynov (AZE)
2016 APB & WSB Olympic Qualifier	3	Carlos Quipo (ECU); Joselito Velázquez (MEX); Leandro Blanc (ARG)
Total	22	

=== Flyweight (52 kg) ===
Competition	Places	Qualified boxer
Host Country	1	Julião Henriques (BRA)
WSB Individual World Rankings	2	Jeyvier Cintrón (PUR); Achraf Kharroubi (MAR)
AIBA Pro Boxing (APB) World Rankings	2	Misha Aloyan (RUS); Elías Emigdio (MEX)
2015 World Amateur Boxing Championships	2	Elvin Mamishzada (AZE); Yosvany Veitía (CUB)
Olympic Qualifying Event – Africa	3	Mohamed Flissi (ALG); Ronald Serugo (UGA); Moroke Mokhotho (LES)^{[d]}
Olympic Qualifying Event – America	2	Fernando Martínez (ARG); Leonel de los Santos (DOM)
Olympic Qualifying Event – Asia/Oceania	3	Hu Jianguan (CHN); Shakhobidin Zoirov (UZB); Olzhas Sattibayev (KAZ)
Olympic Qualifying Event – Europe	3	Muhammad Ali (GBR); Narek Abgaryan (ARM); Brendan Irvine (IRL)
2016 AIBA World Olympic Qualifying Tournament	5	Selçuk Eker (TUR); Daniel Asenov (BUL); Antonio Vargas (USA); Kharkhüügiin Enkh-Amar (MGL); Elie Konki (FRA)
2016 APB & WSB Olympic Qualifier	3	Yoel Finol (VEN); Hamza Touba (GER); Ceiber Ávila (COL)
Total	26	

=== Bantamweight (56 kg) ===
Competition	Places	Qualified boxer
Host Country	1	Robenílson de Jesus (BRA)
WSB Individual World Rankings	2	Vladimir Nikitin (RUS); Mohamed Hamout (MAR)^{[a]}
AIBA Pro Boxing (APB) World Rankings	2	Zhang Jiawei (CHN); Ham Sang-myeong (KOR)
2015 World Amateur Boxing Championships	3	Michael Conlan (IRL); Murodjon Akhmadaliev (UZB); Dzmitry Asanau (BLR)
Olympic Qualifying Event – Africa	3	Inkululeko Suntele (LES); Bilel Mhamdi (TUN); Abdul Omar (GHA)^{[b]}
Olympic Qualifying Event – America	2	Alberto Melián (ARG); Shakur Stevenson (USA)
Olympic Qualifying Event – Asia/Oceania	3	Shiva Thapa (IND); Chatchai Butdee (THA); Kairat Yeraliyev (KAZ)
Olympic Qualifying Event – Europe	3	Qais Ashfaq (GBR); Javid Chalabiyev (AZE); Aram Avagyan (ARM)
2016 AIBA World Olympic Qualifying Tournament	5	Mykola Butsenko (UKR); Robeisy Ramírez (CUB); Erdenebatyn Tsendbaatar (MGL); Arashi Morisaka (JPN); Fahem Hammachi (ALG)
2016 APB & WSB Olympic Qualifier	3	Benson Gicharu (KEN); Héctor García (DOM); Víctor Rodríguez (VEN)
Tripartite Invitation	1	Lionel Warawara (VAN)
Total	28	

=== Lightweight (60 kg) ===
Competition	Places	Qualified boxer
WSB Individual World Rankings	2	Adlan Abdurashidov (RUS); Carlos Balderas (USA)
AIBA Pro Boxing (APB) World Rankings	2	Berik Abdrakhmanov (KAZ); Hurshid Tojibaev (UZB)
2015 World Amateur Boxing Championships	3	Lázaro Álvarez (CUB); Albert Selimov (AZE); Robson Conceição (BRA)
Olympic Qualifying Event – Africa	3	Reda Benbaziz (ALG); Mahmoud Abdelaal (EGY); Andrique Allisop (SEY)
Olympic Qualifying Event – America	3	Luis Angel Cabrera (VEN); Teofimo Lopéz (HON); Ignacio Perrin (ARG)
Olympic Qualifying Event – Asia/Oceania	3	Dorjnyambuugiin Otgondalai (MGL); Charly Suarez (PHI); Daisuke Narimatsu (JPN)
Olympic Qualifying Event – Europe	3	Sofiane Oumiha (FRA); Joseph Cordina (GBR); David Joyce (IRL)
2016 AIBA World Olympic Qualifying Tournament	5	Shan Jun (CHN); Anvar Yunusov (TJK); Enrico Lacruz (NED); Lai Chu-en (TPE); Hakan Erşeker (QAT)
APB & WSB Olympic Qualifier	3	Lindolfo Delgado (MEX); Amnat Ruenroeng (THA); Carmine Tommasone (ITA)
Tripartite Invitation	1	Thadius Katua (PNG)
Total	28	

=== Light welterweight (64 kg) ===
Competition	Places	Qualified boxer
Host Country	1	Joedison Teixeira (BRA)
WSB Individual World Rankings	2	Yasniel Toledo (CUB); Raúl Curiel Garcia (MEX)
AIBA Pro Boxing (APB) World Rankings	2	Artem Harutyunyan (GER); Abdelkader Chadi (ALG)
2015 World Amateur Boxing Championships	3	Vitaly Dunaytsev (RUS); Fazliddin Gaibnazarov (UZB); Wuttichai Masuk (THA)
Olympic Qualifying Event – Africa	3	~~Hamza El-Barbari (MAR)~~; Jonas Junius (NAM); Mahaman Smaila (CMR); Dival Malonga (CGO)
Olympic Qualifying Event – America	2	Arthur Biyarslanov (CAN); Luis Arcon (VEN)
Olympic Qualifying Event – Asia/Oceania	3	Ablaikhan Zhussupov (KAZ); Baatarsükhiin Chinzorig (MGL); Hu Qianxun (CHN)
Olympic Qualifying Event – Europe	3	Lorenzo Sotomayor (AZE); Evaldas Petrauskas (LTU); Batuhan Gözgeç (TUR)
2016 AIBA World Olympic Qualifying Tournament	5	Richardson Hitchins (HAI); Gary Antuanne Russell (USA); Pat McCormack (GBR); Manoj Kumar (IND); Hassan Amzile (FRA)
2016 APB & WSB Olympic Qualifier	3	Thulasi Tharumalingam (QAT); Hovhannes Bachkov (ARM); Volodymyr Matviychuk (UKR)
Tripartite Invitation	1	Obada Al-Kasbeh (JOR)
Total	28	

=== Welterweight (69 kg) ===
Competition	Places	Qualified boxer
WSB Individual World Rankings	2	Parviz Baghirov (AZE); Steven Donnelly (IRL)
AIBA Pro Boxing (APB) World Rankings	2	Onur Şipal (TUR); Andrey Zamkovoy (RUS)
2015 World Amateur Boxing Championships	3	Mohammed Rabii (MAR); Daniyar Yeleussinov (KAZ); Liu Wei (CHN)
Olympic Qualifying Event – Africa	3	Rayton Okwiri (KEN); Walid Sedik Mohamed (EGY); Zohir Kedache (ALG)
Olympic Qualifying Event – America	3	Roniel Iglesias (CUB); Gabriel Maestre (VEN); Alberto Palmetta (ARG)
Olympic Qualifying Event – Asia/Oceania	3	Shakhram Giyasov (UZB); Sailom Adi (THA); Byambyn Tüvshinbat (MGL)
Olympic Qualifying Event – Europe	3	Eimantas Stanionis (LTU); Vincenzo Mangiacapre (ITA); Vladimir Margaryan (ARM)
2016 AIBA World Olympic Qualifying Tournament	5	Imre Bacskai (HUN); Pavel Kastramin (BLR); Souleymane Cissokho (FRA); Josh Kelly (GBR); Simeon Chamov (BUL)
2016 APB & WSB Olympic Qualifier	3	Juan Pablo Romero (MEX); Arajik Marutjan (GER); Youba Sissokho (ESP)
Tripartite Invitation	1	Winston Hill (FIJ)
Total	28	

=== Middleweight (75 kg) ===
Competition	Places	Qualified boxer
WSB Individual World Rankings	2	Tomasz Jabłoński (POL); Ilyas Abbadi (ALG)
AIBA Pro Boxing (APB) World Rankings	2	Artem Chebotarev (RUS); Dmytro Mytrofanov (UKR)^{[e]}
2015 World Amateur Boxing Championships	3	Arlen López (CUB); Bektemir Melikuziev (UZB); Hosam Abdin (EGY)
Olympic Qualifying Event – Africa	3	Wilfried Ntsengue (CMR); Merven Clair (MRI); ~~Said Harnouf (MAR)~~; Anauel Ngamissengue (CGO)
Olympic Qualifying Event – America	3	Misael Rodríguez (MEX); Charles Conwell (USA); Jorge Vivas (COL)
Olympic Qualifying Event – Asia/Oceania	3	Zhanibek Alimkhanuly (KAZ); Zhao Minggang (CHN); Daniel Lewis (AUS)
Olympic Qualifying Event – Europe	3	Christian Mbilli Assomo (FRA); Zoltán Harcsa (HUN); Antony Fowler (GBR)
2016 AIBA World Olympic Qualifying Tournament	5	Michael O'Reilly (IRL); Waheed Abdul-Ridha (IRQ); Arslanbek Achilov (TKM); Vikas Krishan Yadav (IND); Kamran Shakhsuvarly (AZE)
2016 APB & WSB Olympic Qualifier	3	Marlo Delgado (ECU); Endry José Pinto (VEN); Onder Şipal (TUR)
Tripartite Invitation	1	Benny Muziyo (ZAM)
Total	28	

=== Light heavyweight (81 kg) ===
Competition	Places	Qualified boxer
Host Country	1	Michel Borges (BRA)
WSB Individual World Rankings	2	Valentino Manfredonia (ITA); Hrvoje Sep (CRO)
AIBA Pro Boxing (APB) World Rankings	2	Ehsan Rouzbahani (IRI); Mathieu Bauderlique (FRA)
2015 World Amateur Boxing Championships	2	Julio César la Cruz (CUB); Joe Ward (IRL)
Olympic Qualifying Event – Africa	3	Abdelhafid Benchabla (ALG); Abdelrahman Salah (EGY); Kennedy Katende (UGA)
Olympic Qualifying Event – America	2	Albert Ramirez (VEN); Carlos Andres Mina (ECU)
Olympic Qualifying Event – Asia/Oceania	3	Adilbek Niyazymbetov (KAZ); Elshod Rasulov (UZB); Erkin Adylbek Uulu (KGZ)
Olympic Qualifying Event – Europe	3	Peter Müllenberg (NED); Joshua Buatsi (GBR); Mehmet Ünal (TUR)
2016 AIBA World Olympic Qualifying Tournament	5	Petr Khamukov (RUS); Teymur Mammadov (AZE); Mikhail Dauhaliavets (BLR); Serge Michel (GER); Hassan Saada (MAR)
2016 APB & WSB Olympic Qualifier	3	Juan Carlos Carrillo (COL); Hassan N'Dam N'Jikam (CMR); Denys Solonenko (UKR)
Total	26	

=== Heavyweight (91 kg) ===
Competition	Places	Qualified boxer
WSB Individual World Rankings	1	Vasiliy Levit (KAZ)
AIBA Pro Boxing (APB) World Rankings	2	Clemente Russo (ITA); David Graf (GER)
2015 World Amateur Boxing Championships	1	Evgeny Tishchenko (RUS)
Olympic Qualifying Event – Africa	3	Kennedy St-Pierre (MRI); Chouaib Bouloudinat (ALG); Hassen Chaktami (TUN)
Olympic Qualifying Event – America	3	Erislandy Savón (CUB); Yamil Peralta (ARG); Juan Nogueira (BRA)
Olympic Qualifying Event – Asia/Oceania	3	Rustam Tulaganov (UZB); Yu Fengkai (CHN); Jason Whateley (AUS)
Olympic Qualifying Event – Europe	3	Lawrence Okolie (GBR); Paul Omba-Biongolo (FRA); Abdulkadir Abdullayev (AZE)
2016 AIBA World Olympic Qualifying Tournament	1	Igor Jakubowski (POL)
2016 APB & WSB Olympic Qualifier	1	Julio Castillo (ECU)
Total	18	

=== Super heavyweight (+91 kg) ===
Competition	Places	Qualified boxer
WSB Individual World Rankings	1	Filip Hrgović (CRO)
AIBA Pro Boxing (APB) World Rankings	2	Erik Pfeifer (GER); Mihai Nistor (ROU)
2015 World Amateur Boxing Championships	1	Tony Yoka (FRA)
Olympic Qualifying Event – Africa	3	Mohamed Arjaoui (MAR); Efe Ajagba (NGR); Davilson Morais (CPV)^{[c]}
Olympic Qualifying Event – America	3	Nigel Paul (TTO); Lenier Pero (CUB); Clayton Laurent (ISV)
Olympic Qualifying Event – Asia/Oceania	3	Ivan Dychko (KAZ); Bakhodir Jalolov (UZB); Hussein Ishaish (JOR)
Olympic Qualifying Event – Europe	3	Joseph Joyce (GBR); Magomedrasul Majidov (AZE); Ali Eren Demirezen (TUR)
2016 AIBA World Olympic Qualifying Tournament	1	Guido Vianello (ITA)
2016 APB & WSB Olympic Qualifier	1	Edgar Muñoz (VEN)
Total	18	

== Women's events ==
Olympic qualification system per continent and by weight category.

Weight	WC 2016	Continental Qualifier				Host Country	TCI Places	Total Quota
Weight	WC 2016	Africa	America	AS & OC	Europe	Host Country	TCI Places	Total Quota
51 kg	4	1	2	2	2	0	1	12
60 kg	4	1	1*	2	2	1	1	12
75 kg	4	1	2	2	2	0	1	12
Total	12	3	5*	6	6	1	3	36

* The number of quotas for America includes the host country place subtracted.

=== Flyweight (51 kg) ===
Competition	Places	Qualified boxer
2016 World Amateur Boxing Championships	4	Sarah Ourahmoune (FRA); Zhaina Shekerbekova (KAZ); Peamwilai Laopeam (THA); Nicola Adams (GBR)
Olympic Qualifying Event – Africa	1	Zohra Ez-Zahraoui (MAR)
Olympic Qualifying Event – America	2	Mandy Bujold (CAN); Ingrit Valencia (COL)
Olympic Qualifying Event – Asia/Oceania	2	Ren Cancan (CHN); Yodgoroy Mirzaeva (UZB)
Olympic Qualifying Event – Europe	2	Stanimira Petrova (BUL); Tetyana Kob (UKR)
Tripartite Invitation	1	Judith Mbougnade (CAF)
Total	12	

=== Lightweight (60 kg) ===
Competition	Places	Qualified boxer
Host Country	1	Adriana Araújo (BRA)
2016 World Amateur Boxing Championships	4	Katie Taylor (IRL); Estelle Mossely (FRA); Mira Potkonen (FIN); Anastasia Belyakova (RUS)
Olympic Qualifying Event – Africa	1	Hasnaa Lachgar (MAR)
Olympic Qualifying Event – America	1	Mikaela Mayer (USA)
Olympic Qualifying Event – Asia/Oceania	2	Yin Junhua (CHN); Shelley Watts (AUS)
Olympic Qualifying Event – Europe	2	Yana Alekseevna (AZE); Irma Testa (ITA)
Tripartite Invitation	1	Jennifer Chieng (FSM)
Total	12	

=== Middleweight (75 kg) ===
Competition	Places	Qualified boxer
2016 World Amateur Boxing Championships	4	Claressa Shields (USA); Chen Nien-chin (TPE); Savannah Marshall (GBR); Nouchka Fontijn (NED)
Olympic Qualifying Event – Africa	1	Khadija El-Mardi (MAR)
Olympic Qualifying Event – America	2	Ariane Fortin (CAN); Andreia Bandeira (BRA)
Olympic Qualifying Event – Asia/Oceania	2	Li Qian (CHN); Dariga Shakimova (KAZ)
Olympic Qualifying Event – Europe	2	Anna Laurell Nash (SWE); Yaroslava Yakushina (RUS)
Tripartite Invitation	1	Atheyna Bylon (PAN)
Total	12	

== Notes ==
- ^{a} Cuba's Andy Cruz Goméz originally secured a quota place in the men's bantamweight division through the World Series of Boxing (WSB), but later declined. As a result, Cuba's Olympic license was redistributed to Morocco's Mohamed Hamout.
- ^{b} Morocco's Mohamed Hamout originally won a box-off victory over Ghana's Abdul Omar in the men's bantamweight division at the African Olympic Qualification Tournament. Following the adjustment of Olympic qualifying boxers as a result of Cuba's quota decline in the World Series of Boxing (WSB) rankings, Hamout's unused Olympic license was awarded to his opponent Omar in the same tournament.
- ^{c} Tunisia's Aymen Trabelsi originally won a box-off victory over Cape Verde's Davilson Morais in the men's super heavyweight division at the African Olympic Qualification Tournament, but later declined, giving his nation's Olympic license to Morais.
- ^{d} South Africa's Sibusiso Bandla (light flyweight) and Sikho Nqothole (flyweight) secured quota places for the Games through the continental qualifier, but later declined, as SASCOC made an agreement on the Rio 2016 Olympics qualification criteria that the continental qualifying route would not be considered. Hence, the unused places were awarded to Kenya's Peter Mungai Warui in men's light flyweight, and Lesotho's Moroke Mokhotho in men's flyweight, respectively.
- ^{e} Turkey's Adem Kılıççı, who secured a quota place in the men's middleweight division with a top two finish in the AIBA Pro Boxing Rankings (APB), was suspended after his doping samples from London 2012 came back positive in retesting for steroids. As a result, Turkey's Olympic license was redistributed to Ukraine's Dmytro Mytrofanov.
