= 2016 African Boxing Olympic Qualification Tournament =

Boxing competitions

- Location: Yaoundé, Cameroon
- Start date: March 11, 2016
- End date: March 19, 2016

The 2016 African Boxing Olympic Qualification Tournament for the boxing tournament at the 2016 Summer Olympics in Rio de Janeiro, Brazil was held in Yaoundé, Cameroon from March 11 to March 19, 2016.

== Medalists ==
=== Men ===
Event	Gold	Silver	Bronze
−49 kg	Simplice Fotsala; Cameroon	Mathias Hamunyela; Namibia	Peter Mungai Warui; Kenya
−49 kg	Simplice Fotsala; Cameroon	Mathias Hamunyela; Namibia	Sibusiso Bandla; South Africa
−52 kg	Sikho Nqothole; South Africa	Mohamed Flissi; Algeria	Ronald Serugo; Uganda
−52 kg	Sikho Nqothole; South Africa	Mohamed Flissi; Algeria	Moroke Mokhotho; Lesotho
−56 kg	Bilel Mhamdi; Tunisia	Inkululeko Suntele; Lesotho	Mohamed Hamout; Morocco
−56 kg	Bilel Mhamdi; Tunisia	Inkululeko Suntele; Lesotho	Abdul Omar; Ghana
−60 kg	Mahmoud Abdelaal; Egypt	Reda Benbaziz; Algeria	Andrique Allisop; Seychelles
−60 kg	Mahmoud Abdelaal; Egypt	Reda Benbaziz; Algeria	Alaa Shili; Tunisia
−64 kg	Jonas Junius; Namibia	Hamza El-Barbari; Morocco	Mahaman Smaila; Cameroon
−64 kg	Jonas Junius; Namibia	Hamza El-Barbari; Morocco	Dival Malonga; Congo
−69 kg	Rayton Okwiri; Kenya	Walid Sedik Mohamed; Egypt	Zohir Kedache; Algeria
−69 kg	Rayton Okwiri; Kenya	Walid Sedik Mohamed; Egypt	Azumah Mohammed; Ghana
−75 kg	Wilfried Ntsengue; Cameroon	Merven Clair; Mauritius	Said Harnouf; Morocco
−75 kg	Wilfried Ntsengue; Cameroon	Merven Clair; Mauritius	Anauel Ngamissengue; Congo
−81 kg	Abdelhafid Benchabla; Algeria	Abdel Rahman Salah Oraby; Egypt	Kennedy Katende; Uganda
−81 kg	Abdelhafid Benchabla; Algeria	Abdel Rahman Salah Oraby; Egypt	Luvuyo Sizani; South Africa
−91 kg	Kennedy St-Pierre; Mauritius	Chouaib Bouloudinat; Algeria	Hassen Chaktami; Tunisia
−91 kg	Kennedy St-Pierre; Mauritius	Chouaib Bouloudinat; Algeria	Kevin Kuadjovi; Togo
+91 kg	Efe Ajagba; Nigeria	Mohamed Arjaoui; Morocco	Aymen Trabelsi; Tunisia
+91 kg	Efe Ajagba; Nigeria	Mohamed Arjaoui; Morocco	Davilson Morais; Cape Verde

=== Women ===
Event	Gold	Silver	Bronze
−51 kg	Zohra Ez-Zahraoui; Morocco	Caroline Linus; Nigeria	Souhila Bouchene; Algeria
−51 kg	Zohra Ez-Zahraoui; Morocco	Caroline Linus; Nigeria	Mariem Homrani; Tunisia
−60 kg	Hasnaa Lachgar; Morocco	Hlimi Khouloud; Tunisia	Christelle Ndiang; Cameroon
−60 kg	Hasnaa Lachgar; Morocco	Hlimi Khouloud; Tunisia	Elhem Mekhaled; Algeria
−75 kg	Khadija El Mardi; Morocco	Azangue Aubiège Yannicke; Cameroon	Edith Ogoke; Nigeria
−75 kg	Khadija El Mardi; Morocco	Azangue Aubiège Yannicke; Cameroon	Rady Adosinda Ghamane; Mozambique

== Qualification summary ==
NOC	Men										Women			Total
NOC	49	52	56	60	64	69	75	81	91	+91	51	60	75	Total
Algeria		X		X		X		X	X					5
Cameroon	X				X		X							3
Egypt				X		X		X						3
Lesotho			X											1
Kenya						X								1
Mauritius							X		X					2
Morocco			X		X		X			X	X	X	X	7
Namibia	X				X									2
Nigeria										X				1
Seychelles				X										1
South Africa	X	X												2
Tunisia			X						X	X				3
Uganda		X						X						2
Total: 13 NOCs	3	3	3	3	3	3	3	3	3	3	1	1	1	33

== Results ==
=== Men ===
==== Light flyweight (49 kg) ====
Preliminaries
David Daniel de Pina (CPV)	0
Simplice Fotsala (CMR)	3
Mehdi Hajri (TUN)	0
Imad Ahyoun (MAR)	3

Quarterfinals
Zoheir Toudjine (ALG)	0
Simplice Fotsala (CMR)	3
Tetteh Sulemanu (GHA)	0
Peter Mungai Warui (KEN)	3
Sibusiso Bandla (RSA)	3
Faysel Mohamed Argaw (ETH)	0
Imad Ahyoun (MAR)	0
Mathias Hamunyela (NAM)	2

Semifinals
Simplice Fotsala (CMR)	2
Peter Mungai Warui (KEN)	1
Sibusiso Bandla (RSA)	0
Mathias Hamunyela (NAM)	3

Final
Simplice Fotsala (CMR)	WO
Mathias Hamunyela (NAM)

Semifinals	Bronze medal
	Peter Mungai Warui (KEN)	WO
	Sibusiso Bandla (RSA)

==== Flyweight (52 kg) ====
Preliminaries
Simon Nzioki (KEN)	1
Muideen Oyakojo (NGR)	2
Ernest Lemofack (CMR)	0
Moroke Mokhotho (LES)	3
Montassar El-Bouali (TUN)	2
Otukile Rajab Mahomed (BOT)	1
Ronald Serugo (UGA)	3
Abdelrehim Ahmed (EGY)	0
Mick Mikamou Mayelet (GAB)	3
Caristo Bwalya (ZAM)	0
Francel Moussiessie (CGO)	0
Sikho Nqothole (RSA)	3
Luben Kandimba (NAM)	0
Akimos Annang Ampiah (GHA)	3

Quarterfinals
Mohamed Flissi (ALG)	3
Muideen Oyakojo (NGR)	0
Moroke Mokhotho (LES)	2
Montassar El-Bouali (TUN)	1
Ronald Serugo (UGA)	3
Mick Mikamou Mayelet (GAB)	0
Sikho Nqothole (RSA)	3
Akimos Annang Ampiah (GHA)	0

Semifinals
Mohamed Flissi (ALG)	3
Moroke Mokhotho (LES)	0
Ronald Serugo (UGA)	0
Sikho Nqothole (RSA)	3

Final
Mohamed Flissi (ALG)
Sikho Nqothole (RSA)	WO

Semifinals	Bronze medal
	Moroke Mokhotho (LES)
	Ronald Serugo (UGA)	WO

==== Bantamweight (56 kg) ====
Preliminaries – March 12
	Score	
Nesday Bakana Kombo (CGO)	0–3	Emmanuel Ngoma (ZAM)
Koné Yaya (CIV)	0–3	Surafel Getachew Kedu (ETH)
Gerson Silva Rocha (CPV)	0–3	Fillipus Nghitumbwa (NAM)

Preliminaries
Benson Gicharu (KEN)	1
Emmanuel Ngoma (ZAM)	2
Abdul Omar (GHA)	3
Narcisse Mevoah (CMR)	0
Justin Grassa (CAF)	0
Inkululeko Suntele (LES)	3
Atamas Mugerwa (UGA)	3
Hesham Abdelaal (EGY)	0
Mohamed Hamout (MAR)	3
Surafel Getachew Kedu (ETH)	0
Ayabonga Sonjica (RSA)	2
Franck Mombey (GAB)	1
Fahem Hammachi (ALG)	3
Aliou Loko (BEN)	0
Fillipus Nghitumbwa (NAM)	0
Bilel Mhamdi (TUN)	3

Quarterfinals
Emmanuel Ngoma (ZAM)	1
Abdul Omar (GHA)	2
Inkululeko Suntele (LES)	3
Atamas Mugerwa (UGA)	0
Mohamed Hamout (MAR)	3
Ayabonga Sonjica (RSA)	0
Fahem Hammachi (ALG)	0
Bilel Mhamdi (TUN)	3

Semifinals
Abdul Omar (GHA)	1
Inkululeko Suntele (LES)	2
Mohamed Hamout (MAR)	1
Bilel Mhamdi (TUN)	2

Final
Inkululeko Suntele (LES)	0
Bilel Mhamdi (TUN)	3

Semifinals	Bronze medal
	Abdul Omar (GHA)
	Mohamed Hamout (MAR)	WO

==== Lightweight (60 kg) ====
Preliminaries – March 12
	Score	
Sulaiman Segawa (UGA)	3–0	Kabelo Stephan Bagwasi (BOT)
Alex Varela (CPV)	0–3	Alaa Shili (TUN)

Preliminaries
Sulaiman Segawa (UGA)
Reda Benbaziz (ALG)	RSC
Nick Okoth (KEN)	2
Mohlerepe Qhobosheane (LES)	1
Mesfin Keralah (ETH)	2
Paulo Britos (MOZ)	1
Demosthene Roguea (CAF)	0
Andrique Allisop (SEY)	3
Mahmoud Abdelaal (EGY)	3
Nembot Christian (CMR)	0
Kazeem Soyoye (NGR)	3
Lazarus Shaningwa (NAM)	0
Sithembiso Mkhwanazi (SWZ)	0
Kouassi Klaklevi (BEN)	3
Alaa Shili (TUN)	2
Hamza Rabii (MAR)	1

Quarterfinals
Reda Benbaziz (ALG)	2
Nick Okoth (KEN)	1
Mesfin Keralah (ETH)	0
Andrique Allisop (SEY)	3
Mahmoud Abdelaal (EGY)	3
Kazeem Soyoye (NGR)	0
Kouassi Klaklevi (BEN)	0
Alaa Shili (TUN)	3

Semifinals
Reda Benbaziz (ALG)	3
Andrique Allisop (SEY)	0
Mahmoud Abdelaal (EGY)	TKO
Alaa Shili (TUN)

Final
Reda Benbaziz (ALG)
Mahmoud Abdelaal (EGY)	WO

Semifinals	Bronze medal
	Andrique Allisop (SEY)	WO
	Alaa Shili (TUN)

==== Light welterweight (64 kg) ====
Preliminaries – March 12
	Score	
Claudino Semedo (CPV)	0–3	Asanda Gingqi (RSA)
Dotse Dekpakou (TOG)	2–1	Thabiso Selby Dlamini (SWZ)
Jessie Lartey (GHA)	TKO	Jonas Junius (NAM)
Gbessi Eloge Daudau (CIV)	0–3	Bruno Ndong (GAB)

Preliminaries
Kagiso Bagwasi (BOT)	3
Asanda Gingqi (RSA)	0
Tsepo Lepoqo (LES)	0
Dival Malonga (CGO)	3
Richarno Colin (MRI)	3
Victor Nyadera (KEN)	0
Dotse Dekpakou (TOG)	0
Hamza El-Barbari (MAR)	3
Eslam Mohamed (EGY)	0
Jonas Junius (NAM)	2
Mekki Ben Said (TUN)	0
Girmachew Badesse (ETH)	3
Mahaman Smaila (CMR)	3
Simon-Martial Ngocko (CAF)	0
Bruno Ndong (GAB)	0
Shafiq Chitou (BEN)	3

Quarterfinals
Kagiso Bagwasi (BOT)
Dival Malonga (CGO)	TKO
Richarno Colin (MRI)	0
Hamza El-Barbari (MAR)	3
Jonas Junius (NAM)	TKO
Girmachew Badesse (ETH)
Mahaman Smaila (CMR)	2
Shafiq Chitou (BEN)	1

Semifinals
Dival Malonga (CGO)	0
Hamza El-Barbari (MAR)	3
Jonas Junius (NAM)	3
Mahaman Smaila (CMR)	0

Final
Hamza El-Barbari (MAR)
Jonas Junius (NAM)	WO

Semifinals	Bronze medal
	Dival Malonga (CGO)
	Mahaman Smaila (CMR)	WO

==== Welterweight (69 kg) ====
Preliminaries
Adamou Kohautto–Ngouando (CAF)	0
Christian Abua (NGR)	3
Azumah Mohammed (GHA)	2
Abel Mikasiu (NAM)	1
Jean-Luc Rosalba (MRI)	0
Salif Nsangou Njikam (CMR)	2
Thamer Marzouk (TUN)	TKO
Antóni de Barros (CPV)
Zohir Kedache (ALG)	3
Justin Hounkpevi (BEN)	0
Mbachi Kaonga (ZAM)	3
Cédric Massala (CGO)	0
Lentswe Zwinila (BOT)	0
Walid Sedik Mohamed (EGY)	3

Quarterfinals
Rayton Okwiri (KEN)	3
Christian Abua (NGR)	0
Azumah Mohammed (GHA)	3
Salif Nsangou Njikam (CMR)	0
Thamer Marzouk (TUN)	1
Zohir Kedache (ALG)	2
Mbachi Kaonga (ZAM)	0
Walid Sedik Mohamed (EGY)	3

Semifinals
Rayton Okwiri (KEN)	3
Azumah Mohammed (GHA)	0
Zohir Kedache (ALG)	0
Walid Sedik Mohamed (EGY)	3

Final
Rayton Okwiri (KEN)	2
Walid Sedik Mohamed (EGY)	0

Semifinals	Bronze medal
	Azumah Mohammed (GHA)
	Zohir Kedache (ALG)	WO

==== Middleweight (75 kg) ====
Preliminaries – March 12
	Score	
Titus Joseph (NAM)	3–0	Cheick Oumar Sissoko (MLI)
Frédy Christ Londji (GAB)	0–3	Benny Muziyo (ZAM)

Preliminaries
Zibani Chikanda (BOT)	3
Titus Joseph (NAM)	0
Anauel Ngamissengue (CGO)	TKO
Khadim Fall (SEN)
Issouf Coulibaly (CIV)
Wilfried Ntsengue (CMR)	TKO
Carlos Glory L'Muala (COD)	0
Yahia El-Mekachari (TUN)	3
John Shina Olawale Koudeha (TOG)	0
Merven Clair (MRI)	3
Musah Rahman Lawson (GHA)	TKO
Korede Mojeed Adeniji (NGR)
Said Harnouf (MAR)	2
Raul Obama Mangue (GEQ)	1
Benny Muziyo (ZAM)	2
Nickson Abaka (KEN)	1

Quarterfinals
Zibani Chikanda (BOT)	0
Anauel Ngamissengue (CGO)	3
Wilfried Ntsengue (CMR)	2
Yahia El-Mekachari (TUN)	1
Merven Clair (MRI)	2
Musah Rahman Lawson (GHA)	1
Said Harnouf (MAR)	3
Benny Muziyo (ZAM)	0

Semifinals
Anauel Ngamissengue (CGO)	0
Wilfried Ntsengue (CMR)	3
Merven Clair (MRI)	3
Said Harnouf (MAR)	0

Final
Wilfried Ntsengue (CMR)	3
Merven Clair (MRI)	0

Semifinals	Bronze medal
	Anauel Ngamissengue (CGO)
	Said Harnouf (MAR)	WO

==== Light heavyweight (81 kg) ====
Preliminaries
Jean Nicole Jovette (SEY)	3
Lopes Borges (CPV)	0
Yoada Aboubacar (CIV)	0
Kennedy Katende (UGA)	3
Sadiq Umar (NGR)	3
Wajdi Fessi (TUN)	0
De-Westel Kala (CGO)	DSQ
Humphrey Ochieng (KEN)
Luvuyo Sizani (RSA)	2
Vivian Obame (GAB)	1
Hassan Saada (MAR)	0
Ulrich Yombo (CMR)	3

Quarterfinals
Abdelhafid Benchabla (ALG)	WO
Jean Nicole Jovette (SEY)
Kennedy Katende (UGA)	3
Sadiq Umar (NGR)	0
Humphrey Ochieng (KEN)	0
Luvuyo Sizani (RSA)	3
Ulrich Yombo (CMR)	0
Abdel Rahman Salah Oraby (EGY)	3

Semifinals
Abdelhafid Benchabla (ALG)	3
Kennedy Katende (UGA)	0
Luvuyo Sizani (RSA)	0
Abdel Rahman Salah Oraby (EGY)	3

Final
Abdelhafid Benchabla (ALG)	3
Abdel Rahman Salah Oraby (EGY)	0

Semifinals	Bronze medal
	Kennedy Katende (UGA)	WO
	Luvuyo Sizani (RSA)

==== Heavyweight (91 kg) ====
Preliminaries
Abdeljalil Abouhamda (MAR)	0
Efetobor Apochi (NGR)	3
Willy Kyakonye (UGA)
David Akankolim (GHA)	TKO
Mohamed Ibrahim Taha (EGY)
Kevin Kuadjovi (TOG)	TKO
Hassen Chaktami (TUN)	3
Roger Tessa Kumbila (GAB)	0
Elly Ochola (KEN)	3
Christian Ndziye Tsoye (CMR)	0
Evariste Laguerre (CAF)
Arnold Phuzi (RSA)	TKO

Quarterfinals
Kennedy St-Pierre (MRI)	3
Efetobor Apochi (NGR)	0
David Akankolim (GHA)
Kevin Kuadjovi (TOG)	TKO
Hassen Chaktami (TUN)	3
Elly Ochola (KEN)	0
Arnold Phuzi (RSA)	0
Chouaib Bouloudinat (ALG)	3

Semifinals
Kennedy St-Pierre (MRI)	2
Kevin Kuadjovi (TOG)	1
Hassen Chaktami (TUN)	1
Chouaib Bouloudinat (ALG)	2

Final
Kennedy St-Pierre (MRI)	2
Chouaib Bouloudinat (ALG)	1

Semifinals	Bronze medal
	Kevin Kuadjovi (TOG)
	Hassen Chaktami (TUN)	WO

==== Super heavyweight (+91 kg) ====
Preliminaries
Ardi Ndembo (CGO)	1
Mohamed Grimes (ALG)	2
Emmanuel Sandyman (GHA)	WO
Arsène Fokou Fosso (CMR)
Fredrick Ramogi (KEN)	0
Uosry Rezk Mostafa (EGY)	3
Efe Ajagba (NGR)	3
Michael Sekabembe (UGA)	0

Quarterfinals
Mohamed Arjaoui (MAR)	3
Mohamed Grimes (ALG)	0
Emmanuel Sandyman (GHA)	0
Davilson Morais (CPV)	3
Aymen Trabelsi (TUN)	3
Uosry Rezk Mostafa (EGY)	0
Efe Ajagba (NGR)	TKO
Keddy Agnes (SEY)

Semifinals
Mohamed Arjaoui (MAR)	3
Davilson Morais (CPV)	0
Aymen Trabelsi (TUN)
Efe Ajagba (NGR)	KO

Final
Mohamed Arjaoui (MAR)	DSQ
Efe Ajagba (NGR)

Semifinals	Bronze medal
	Davilson Morais (CPV)
	Aymen Trabelsi (TUN)	WO

=== Women ===
==== Flyweight (51 kg) ====
Preliminaries
Ramatu Quaye (GHA)	0
Christine Akoa Bengono (CMR)	3
Koketso Dipugiso (BOT)	2
Judith Mbougnade (CAF)	0
Christine Ongare (KEN)	3
Lewissia Nzaba (GAB)	0

Quarterfinals
Souhila Bouchene (ALG)	WO
Christine Akoa Bengono (CMR)
Juliana Kasonka (ZAM)	0
Zohra Ez-Zahraoui (MAR)	3
Mariem Homrani (TUN)	3
Koketso Dipugiso (BOT)	0
Christine Ongare (KEN)	0
Caroline Linus (NGR)	3

Semifinals
Souhila Bouchene (ALG)	1
Zohra Ez-Zahraoui (MAR)	2
Mariem Homrani (TUN)	0
Caroline Linus (NGR)	3

Final
Zohra Ez-Zahraoui (MAR)	2
Caroline Linus (NGR)	1

Semifinals	Bronze medal
	Souhila Bouchene (ALG)	WO
	Mariem Homrani (TUN)

==== Lightweight (60 kg) ====
Preliminaries
Hasnaa Lachgar (MAR)	TKO
Teresiah Mwangi (KEN)

Quarterfinals
Kehinda Joy Obareh (NGR)	0
Hasnaa Lachgar (MAR)	3
Christelle Ndiang (CMR)	3
Ayat El-Said (EGY)	0
Angela Augusto (MOZ)	0
Elhem Mekhaled (ALG)	3
Keamogetse Kenosi (BOT)	0
Hlimi Khouloud (TUN)	3

Semifinals
Hasnaa Lachgar (MAR)	3
Christelle Ndiang (CMR)	0
Elhem Mekhaled (ALG)	0
Hlimi Khouloud (TUN)	3

Final
Hasnaa Lachgar (MAR)	2
Hlimi Khouloud (TUN)	1

Semifinals	Bronze medal
	Christelle Ndiang (CMR)	WO
	Elhem Mekhaled (ALG)

==== Middleweight (75 kg) ====
The two finalists will qualify.

Quarterfinals		Semifinals		Final
		Edith Ogoke (NGR)	0
Azangue Aubiège Yannicke (CMR)	3	Azangue Aubiège Yannicke (CMR)	3
Rana Abdelhamid (EGY)	0			Azangue Aubiège Yannicke (CMR)	0
Elizabeth Akinyi (KEN)	0			Khadija El-Mardi (MAR)	3
Rady Adosinda Ghamane (MOZ)	3	Rady Adosinda Ghamane (MOZ)	0
		Khadija El-Mardi (MAR)	3

Semifinals	Bronze medal
	Edith Ogoke (NGR)	WO
	Rady Adosinda Ghamane (MOZ)
