= 2017 African Amateur Boxing Championships =

Boxing competitions

- Host city: Brazzaville
- Country: Republic of the Congo
- Nations: 24
- Athletes: 183
- Events: 18
- Dates: 18–25 June 2017

The 2017 African Amateur Boxing Championships were held in Brazzaville, Republic of the Congo from 18 to 25 June 2017. It was the 19th edition of this event (and the first as a unified championships for men and women) organised by the African governing body for amateur boxing, the African Boxing Confederation (AFBC).

== Medal summary ==
=== Men ===
| Event | Gold | Silver | Bronze |
|---|---|---|---|
| Light flyweight (49 kg) | Mathias Hamunyela; Namibia | Simplice Fotsala; Cameroon | Shaffi Bakari; Kenya |
| Light flyweight (49 kg) | Mathias Hamunyela; Namibia | Simplice Fotsala; Cameroon | Touareg Mohamed; Algeria |
| Flyweight (52 kg) | Mohamed Flissi; Algeria | Rajab Mahommed; Botswana | Marco Jérôme Andrianarivelo; Madagascar |
| Flyweight (52 kg) | Mohamed Flissi; Algeria | Rajab Mahommed; Botswana | Sankuru Nkolomoni; DR Congo |
| Bantamweight (56 kg) | Jordy Vadamootoo; Mauritius | Godfrey Kakeeto; Uganda | Gerson Rocha; Cape Verde |
| Bantamweight (56 kg) | Jordy Vadamootoo; Mauritius | Godfrey Kakeeto; Uganda | Bilel Mhamdi; Tunisia |
| Lightweight (60 kg) | Nick Okoth; Kenya | Reda Benbaziz; Algeria | Mohamed Hamout; Morocco |
| Lightweight (60 kg) | Nick Okoth; Kenya | Reda Benbaziz; Algeria | Jean John Colin; Mauritius |
| Light welterweight (64 kg) | Jonas Jonas; Namibia | Eslam El-Gendy; Egypt | Dival Malonga; Congo |
| Light welterweight (64 kg) | Jonas Jonas; Namibia | Eslam El-Gendy; Egypt | Fiston Mbaya Mulumba; DR Congo |
| Welterweight (69 kg) | Muzamir Kakande; Uganda | Merven Clair; Mauritius | Nkumbu Silungwe; Zambia |
| Welterweight (69 kg) | Muzamir Kakande; Uganda | Merven Clair; Mauritius | Walid Sedik Mohamed; Egypt |
| Middleweight (75 kg) | Wilfried Ntsengue; Cameroon | Hosam Bakr Abdin; Egypt | Anauel Ngamissengue; Congo |
| Middleweight (75 kg) | Wilfried Ntsengue; Cameroon | Hosam Bakr Abdin; Egypt | John Kyalo; Kenya |
| Light heavyweight (81 kg) | Ulrich Yombo; Cameroon | Chouaib Ouahbi; Morocco | Mbachi Kaonga; Zambia |
| Light heavyweight (81 kg) | Ulrich Yombo; Cameroon | Chouaib Ouahbi; Morocco | Ngalebaya Rodrigue; Congo |
| Heavyweight (91 kg) | Abdeljalil Abouhamada; Morocco | Laury Pembouabeka; Congo | Christian Tsoye; Cameroon |
| Heavyweight (91 kg) | Abdeljalil Abouhamada; Morocco | Laury Pembouabeka; Congo | Tumba Silva; Angola |
| Super heavyweight (+91 kg) | Arsène Fokou Fosso; Cameroon | David Ayiti; Uganda | Yousry Hafez; Egypt |
| Super heavyweight (+91 kg) | Arsène Fokou Fosso; Cameroon | David Ayiti; Uganda | Carlos Macia; Angola |

=== Women ===
| Event | Gold | Silver | Bronze |
|---|---|---|---|
| Light flyweight (48 kg) | Souhila Bouchene; Algeria | Christine Akoa Bengono; Cameroon | Amel Chebbi; Tunisia |
| Light flyweight (48 kg) | Souhila Bouchene; Algeria | Christine Akoa Bengono; Cameroon | Miora Tina Andriamiarisoa; Madagascar |
| Flyweight (51 kg) | Yasmine Moutaki; Morocco | Roumaïssa Boualem; Algeria | Esotia Rosette Ndongala; Congo |
| Flyweight (51 kg) | Yasmine Moutaki; Morocco | Roumaïssa Boualem; Algeria | Christine Ongare; Kenya |
| Bantamweight (54 kg) | Ouidad Sefouh; Algeria | Nadege Niambongui; Central African Republic | Essele Jaelle; Congo |
| Bantamweight (54 kg) | Ouidad Sefouh; Algeria | Nadege Niambongui; Central African Republic | Bibiche Ndaja Miki; DR Congo |
| Featherweight (57 kg) | Christelle Ndiang; Cameroon | Nour Ba Ahmed; Algeria | Dieynabo Diallo; Senegal |
| Featherweight (57 kg) | Christelle Ndiang; Cameroon | Nour Ba Ahmed; Algeria | Modestine Munga Zalia; DR Congo |
| Lightweight (60 kg) | Marcelat Sakobi Matshu; DR Congo | Yetunde Odunuga; Nigeria | Houria Triki; Algeria |
| Lightweight (60 kg) | Marcelat Sakobi Matshu; DR Congo | Yetunde Odunuga; Nigeria | Chaimaa Rhadi; Morocco |
| Light welterweight (64 kg) | Oumaïma Belahbib; Morocco | Soumia Tabarkouk; Algeria | Aratwa Kasemang; Botswana |
| Light welterweight (64 kg) | Oumaïma Belahbib; Morocco | Soumia Tabarkouk; Algeria | Herline Sharufa Rachidi; DR Congo |
| Welterweight (69 kg) | Yannick Aubiège Azangue; Cameroon | Hadjila Khelif; Algeria | Fatima Zahra Bassim; Morocco |
| Welterweight (69 kg) | Yannick Aubiège Azangue; Cameroon | Hadjila Khelif; Algeria | None awarded |
| Middleweight (75 kg) | Clotilde Essiane; Cameroon | Amina Ettir; Morocco | Elizabeth Akinyi; Kenya |
| Middleweight (75 kg) | Clotilde Essiane; Cameroon | Amina Ettir; Morocco | Jorbelle Malewu; DR Congo |

== Medal table ==
| Rank | Nation | Gold | Silver | Bronze | Total |
|---|---|---|---|---|---|
| 1 | Cameroon | 6 | 2 | 1 | 9 |
| 2 | Algeria | 3 | 5 | 2 | 10 |
| 3 | Morocco | 3 | 2 | 3 | 8 |
| 4 | Namibia | 2 | 0 | 0 | 2 |
| 5 | Uganda | 1 | 2 | 0 | 3 |
| 6 | Mauritius | 1 | 1 | 1 | 3 |
| 7 | DR Congo | 1 | 0 | 6 | 7 |
| 8 | Kenya | 1 | 0 | 4 | 5 |
| 9 | Egypt | 0 | 2 | 2 | 4 |
| 10 | Congo | 0 | 1 | 5 | 6 |
| 11 | Botswana | 0 | 1 | 1 | 2 |
| 12 | Central African Republic | 0 | 1 | 0 | 1 |
| 12 | Nigeria | 0 | 1 | 0 | 1 |
| 14 | Angola | 0 | 0 | 2 | 2 |
| 14 | Madagascar | 0 | 0 | 2 | 2 |
| 14 | Tunisia | 0 | 0 | 2 | 2 |
| 14 | Zambia | 0 | 0 | 2 | 2 |
| 18 | Cape Verde | 0 | 0 | 1 | 1 |
| 18 | Senegal | 0 | 0 | 1 | 1 |
| Totals (19 entries) | | 18 | 18 | 35 | 71 |
