= Zibani Chikanda =

Botswana boxer (born 1985)

Personal information
- Nickname: Ganda-Ganda
- Nationality: Botswana
- Born: 23 August 1985 (age 40) Mathangwane, Botswana
- Weight: Middleweight

Boxing career
Medal record
Men's amateur boxing
Representing Botswana
African Games
Bronze medal – third place	2015 Brazzaville	Middleweight
African Championships
Silver medal – second place	2015 Casablanca	Middleweight
Zone 4 African Championships
Gold medal – first place	2015 Pretoria	Middleweight
Gold medal – first place	2016 Maputo	Middleweight

Zibani Chikanda (born 23 August 1985) is a Botswana former amateur boxer who competed at middleweight. He won a bronze medal at the 2015 African Games and a silver at the 2015 African Championships.

He was also a nine-time national champion, winning consecutive titles from 2009 to 2017. For his accomplishments, he was named sportsman of the year by the Botswana National Sports Commission in 2016.

== Early life ==
Chikanda was born on 23 August 1985 in Mathangwane, a village in the Central District of Botswana. He attended McConnell Senior Secondary School in nearby Tutume, initially focusing on volleyball before his older brother Buzani forced him to try boxing. He began training in 2002 but took a break from the sport after finishing school. In 2007 he was conscripted into the Botswana Defence Force, where he was able to make his return to the ring as a member of the Eastern Military Garrison boxing club, which he represented throughout his amateur career.

== Amateur career ==
In 2009, Chikanda was first called up to the Botswana national team. Later that year he won his first of nine national championships with a narrow decision victory over Gomotsang Gaasite. His first international competition was the 2011 Zone 4 African Championships, where he was the only member of Team Botswana who failed to medal. He found limited success on the international stage for the next three years, with his sole notable result being a bronze medal-finish at the 2012 African Cup of Nations.

His career resurged in April 2015 at the Zone 4 African Championships in Pretoria, where he won all three of his bouts en route to a gold medal. Four months later, he reached the finals of the African Championships in Casablanca, falling to future World Championship bronze medallist Hosam Bakr Abdin. He continued his success at the African Games that September, reaching the semi-finals and taking home a bronze medal. He then participated at the 2015 World Championships in Doha, suffering a first-round defeat to Aljaž Venko of Slovenia. In December he was named boxer of the year by the Botswana Boxing Association. He would also be named sportsman of the year by the Botswana National Sports Commission a few months later, beating out heavily-favourited world-class sprinter Isaac Makwala and karateka Ofentse Bakwadi for the honour.

He started 2016 by replicating his gold-medal performance at the Zone 4 African Championships in January. At the African Olympic Qualification Tournament two months later, he beat Titus Joseph of Namibia in the preliminary round before being eliminated by Anauel Ngamissengue. Chikanda then headlined an interclub tournament held at the Eastern Military Garrison in Selebi-Phikwe, his home training ground. For the second year in a row he was named boxer of the year by the Botswana Boxing Association.

He made an appearance at the 2017 African Championships in Brazzaville, but was knocked out in his first fight by Ngamissengué. His final bout was at the 2017 National Championships in Gaborone, where he was able to win his ninth consecutive national title before retiring.

== Amateur results ==
- 2011 Zone 4 African Championships in Gaborone, Botswana (middleweight)
  - Lost to Josephat Mufayi (Zimbabwe) PTS
- 2012 African Cup of Nations in Gaborone, Botswana (middleweight)
  - Lost to Mohamed Amine Meskini (Tunisia) 18–23
  - Defeated Steven Masiyambumbi (Zimbabwe) 22–8
  - Lost to Sofiane Tabi (Algeria) 12–20 (bronze)
- 2015 Botswana Best of the Best Tournament in Gaborone, Botswana (light heavyweight)
  - Lost to Thabang Motsewabeng 0–3 (silver)
- 2015 Zone 4 African Championships in Pretoria, South Africa (middleweight)
  - Defeated Vidal Antonio Galeta (Angola) 3–0
  - Defeated Siphiwe Lusizi (South Africa) WO
  - Defeated Lourenço Cossa (Mozambique) 3–0 (gold)
- 2015 African Championships in Casablanca, Morocco (middleweight)
  - Defeated Mayk Miyenikoue Nruguen (Gabon) 3–0
  - Defeated Lassina Keita (Mali) TKO2
  - Defeated John Koudeha (Togo) TKO2
  - Lost to Hosam Bakr Abdin (Egypt) 0–3 (silver)
- 2015 African Games in Brazzaville, Congo (middleweight)
  - Defeated Getachew Akililu (Ethiopia) TKO2
  - Defeated Lourenço Cossa (Mozambique) 3–0
  - Lost to Glory L'Muala (DR Congo) 0–3 (bronze)
- 2015 World Championships in Doha, Qatar (middleweight)
  - Lost to Aljaž Venko (Slovenia) 0–3
- 2016 Zone 4 African Championships in Maputo, Mozambique (middleweight)
  - Defeated Thanda Mkhatjwa (Swaziland) TKO
  - Defeated Sinamiso Ntuli (South Africa) 3–0 (gold)
- 2016 African Olympic Qualification Tournament in Yaoundé, Cameroon (middleweight)
  - Defeated Titus Joseph (Namibia) 3–0
  - Lost to Anauel Ngamissengue (Congo) 0–3
- 2017 African Championships in Brazzaville, Congo (middleweight)
  - Lost to Anauel Ngamissengue (Congo) KO1
