= Morocco at the 2016 Summer Olympics =

- IOC code: MAR
- NOC: Moroccan Olympic Committee
- Website: www.cnom.org.ma (in French)

in Rio de Janeiro
- Competitors: 49 in 13 sports
- Flag bearers: Abdelkebir Ouaddar (opening); Wiam Dislam (closing)
- Medals Ranked 78th: Gold 0 Silver 0 Bronze 1 Total 1

Summer Olympics appearances (overview)
- 1960; 1964; 1968; 1972; 1976; 1980; 1984; 1988; 1992; 1996; 2000; 2004; 2008; 2012; 2016; 2020; 2024

Morocco competed at the 2016 Summer Olympics in Rio de Janeiro, Brazil, from 5 to 21 August 2016. This was the nation's fourteenth appearance at the Summer Olympics.

Moroccan Olympic Committee (French: Comité Olympique Marocain) fielded a squad of 49 athletes, 29 men and 20 women, across 13 sports at the Games. It was the nation's largest delegation sent to the Olympics without any participants in team-based sports, but third-largest overall in history. Nearly forty percent of the Moroccan delegation competed in the track and field; there was only a single competitor each in slalom canoeing, equestrian, fencing, golf (new to the 2016 Games), and shooting.

Fifteen athletes on the Moroccan roster competed at the previous Olympics in London, with the rest of the field making their Olympic debut in Rio de Janeiro. Among the nation's athletes were 2012 bronze medalist Abdalaati Iguider in distance running, taekwondo fighter Wiam Dislam (women's +67 kg), Greco-Roman wrestler Zied Ayet Ikram, who competed for Tunisia at the previous Games, and 54-year-old show jumper Abdelkebir Ouaddar, who led his delegation as the oldest competitor and flag bearer in the opening ceremony.

For the second Olympics in a row, Morocco left Rio de Janeiro with only a bronze medal, won by world-ranked pro boxer Mohammed Rabii in the men's welterweight division. Five Moroccan athletes advanced to the finals of their respective sporting events but narrowly missed out of the podium, including Iguider, Dislam, along with her fellow taekwondo teammates Omar Hajjami and Naima Bakkal, and steeplechaser Soufiane Elbakkali.

== Medalists ==
Medal	Name	Sport	Event	Date
Bronze	Mohammed Rabii	Boxing	Men's welterweight	15 August

== Athletics (track and field) ==
Moroccan athletes have so far achieved qualifying standards in the following athletics events (up to a maximum of 3 athletes in each event):

A total of 18 athletes (13 men and 5 women), highlighted by middle-distance runner and London 2012 bronze medalist Abdalaati Iguider, were named as part of Morocco's official team announcement for the Games on July 15, 2016.

Key

- Note–Ranks given for track events are within the athlete's heat only
- Q = Qualified for the next round
- q = Qualified for the next round as a fastest loser or, in field events, by position without achieving the qualifying target
- NR = National record
- N/A = Round not applicable for the event
- Bye = Athlete not required to compete in round

Track & road events
Men

Athlete	Event	Heat		Quarterfinal		Semifinal		Final	
Athlete	Event	Result	Rank	Result	Rank	Result	Rank	Result	Rank
Aziz Ouhadi	100 m	Bye		10.34	6	Did not advance			
Abdelati El Guesse	800 m	DNF		—		Did not advance			
Mostafa Smaili	800 m	1:49.29	2 Q	—		1:45.78	5	Did not advance	
Fouad Elkaam	1500 m	3:39.51	6 Q	—		3:40.93	9	Did not advance	
Abdalaati Iguider	1500 m	3:38.40	3 Q	—		3:40.11	6 q	3:50.58	5
Brahim Kaazouzi	1500 m	3:47.39	6 Q	—		3:48.66	13	Did not advance	
Soufiyan Bouqantar	5000 m	13:56.55	18	—				Did not advance	
Younès Essalhi	5000 m	13:41.41	14	—				Did not advance	
Soufiane Elbakkali	3000 m steeplechase	8:25.17	2 Q	—				8:14.35	4
Hamid Ezzine	3000 m steeplechase	8:27.69	5 q	—				DNF	
Hicham Sigueni	3000 m steeplechase	8:27.82	7	—				Did not advance	
Abdelmajid El Hissouf	Marathon	—						2:20:29	68
Rachid Kisri	Marathon	—						2:21:00	73

Women

Athlete	Event	Heat		Semifinal		Final	
Athlete	Event	Result	Rank	Result	Rank	Result	Rank
Malika Akkaoui	800 m	2:00.52	4	Did not advance			
Rababe Arafi	800 m	DNF		Did not advance			
Malika Akkaoui	1500 m	4:07.42	5 Q	4:08.55	8	Did not advance	
Rababe Arafi	1500 m	4:06.63	4 Q	4:05.60	7 q	4:15.16	12
Siham Hilali	1500 m	4:13.46	9	Did not advance			
Hayat Lambarki	400 m hurdles	1:00.83	6	—		Did not advance	
Salima Ouali Alami	3000 m steeplechase	9:44.83	10	—		Did not advance	
Fadwa Sidi Madane	3000 m steeplechase	9:32.94	11	—		Did not advance	
Koutar Boulaid	Marathon	—				DNF	

== Boxing ==
Morocco has entered eight boxers to compete in each of the following weight classes into the Olympic boxing tournament. Mohammed Rabii was the only Moroccan to be selected to the Olympic team through the 2015 World Championships, while Achraf Kharroubi and Mohamed Hamout finished among the top two of their respective weight divisions in the World Series of Boxing.

Mohamed Arjaoui and three women's boxers (Ez-Zahraoui, Lachgar, and El-Mardi) had claimed their Olympic spots at the 2016 African Qualification Tournament in Yaoundé, Cameroon.

Hassan Saada secured an additional Olympic place on the Moroccan roster as a quarterfinalist losing to the eventual champion Teymur Mammadov of Azerbaijan at the 2016 AIBA World Qualifying Tournament in Baku.

Men

Athlete	Event	Round of 32	Round of 16	Quarterfinals	Semifinals	Final	
Athlete	Event	Opposition Result	Opposition Result	Opposition Result	Opposition Result	Opposition Result	Rank
Achraf Kharroubi	Flyweight	Mokhotho (LES); W 3–0	Veitía (CUB); L 0–3	Did not advance			
Mohamed Hamout	Bantamweight	Butsenko (UKR); W 2–0	Ramírez (CUB); L 1–2	Did not advance			
Mohammed Rabii	Welterweight	Bye	Okwiri (KEN); W 3–0	Donnelly (IRL); W 2–1	Giyasov (UZB); L 0–3	Did not advance	3rd place, bronze medalist(s)
Hassan Saada	Light heavyweight	Ünal (TUR); L WO	Did not advance				
Mohamed Arjaoui	Super heavyweight	Majidov (AZE); L 0–3	Did not advance				

Women

Athlete	Event	Round of 16	Quarterfinals	Semifinals	Final	
Athlete	Event	Opposition Result	Opposition Result	Opposition Result	Opposition Result	Rank
Zohra Ez-Zahraoui	Flyweight	Ourahmoune (FRA); L 0–3	Did not advance			
Hasnaa Lachgar	Lightweight	Yin Jh (CHN); L 0–3	Did not advance			
Khadija El-Mardi	Middleweight	Bye	Shakimova (KAZ); L 0–3	Did not advance		

== Canoeing ==
=== Slalom ===
Morocco has qualified one canoeist in the women's K-1 class by obtaining a top finish at the 2015 African Canoe Slalom Championships in Sagana, Kenya.

Athlete	Event	Preliminary						Semifinal		Final	
Athlete	Event	Run 1	Rank	Run 2	Rank	Best	Rank	Time	Rank	Time	Rank
Hind Jamili	Women's K-1	153.00	20	149.87	18	149.87	21	Did not advance			

== Cycling ==
=== Road ===
Moroccan riders qualified for a maximum of three quota places in the men's Olympic road race by virtue of their top 4 national ranking in the 2015 UCI Africa Tour.

Athlete	Event	Time	Rank
Anass Aït El Abdia	Men's road race	6:30:05	47
Soufiane Haddi	Men's road race	Did not finish	
Mouhssine Lahsaini	Men's road race	Did not finish	
Mouhssine Lahsaini	Men's time trial	1:25:11.72	33

== Equestrian ==
Morocco has entered one jumping rider into the Olympic equestrian competition by virtue of a top national finish from Africa & Middle East in the individual International Federation for Equestrian Sports (FEI) Olympic Rankings.

=== Jumping ===
Athlete	Horse	Event	Qualification								Final					Total	
Athlete	Horse	Event	Round 1		Round 2			Round 3			Round A		Round B			Total	
Athlete	Horse	Event	Penalties	Rank	Penalties	Total	Rank	Penalties	Total	Rank	Penalties	Rank	Penalties	Total	Rank	Penalties	Rank
Abdelkebir Ouaddar	Quickly de Kreisker	Individual	4	=27 Q	9	13	50	Did not advance									

== Fencing ==
Morocco has entered one fencer into the Olympic competition. Youssra Zekrani had claimed her Olympic spot as the sole winner of the women's foil at the African Zonal Qualifier in Algiers, Algeria.

Athlete	Event	Round of 64	Round of 32	Round of 16	Quarterfinal	Semifinal	Final / BM	
Athlete	Event	Opposition Score	Opposition Score	Opposition Score	Opposition Score	Opposition Score	Opposition Score	Rank
Youssra Zekrani	Women's foil	—	Le Hl (CHN); L 4–15	Did not advance				

== Golf ==
Morocco has entered one golfer into the Olympic tournament. Maha Haddioui (world no. 560) qualified directly among the top 60 eligible players for the women's event based on the IGF World Rankings as of 11 July 2016.

Athlete	Event	Round 1	Round 2	Round 3	Round 4	Total		
Athlete	Event	Score	Score	Score	Score	Score	Par	Rank
Maha Haddioui	Women's	82	76	80	77	315	+31	59

== Judo ==
Morocco has qualified three judokas for each of the following weight classes at the Games. Imad Bassou and Assmaa Niang were ranked among the top 22 eligible judokas for men and top 14 for women in the IJF World Ranking List of May 30, 2016, while London 2012 Olympian Rizlen Zouak at women's half-middleweight (63 kg) earned a continental quota spot from the African region, as the highest-ranked Moroccan judoka outside of direct qualifying position.

Athlete	Event	Round of 64	Round of 32	Round of 16	Quarterfinals	Semifinals	Repechage	Final / BM	
Athlete	Event	Opposition Result	Opposition Result	Opposition Result	Opposition Result	Opposition Result	Opposition Result	Opposition Result	Rank
Imad Bassou	Men's −66 kg	Bye	Katz (AUS); W 001–000	Bouchard (CAN); L 000–001	Did not advance				
Rizlen Zouak	Women's −63 kg	—	Tsedevsüren (MGL); L 000–101	Did not advance					
Assmaa Niang	Women's −70 kg	—	Portela (BRA); L 000–001	Did not advance					

== Shooting ==
Morocco has received an invitation from ISSF to send Mohamed Ramah in the men's double trap to the Olympics, as long as the minimum qualifying score (MQS) was fulfilled by March 31, 2016.

Athlete	Event	Qualification		Semifinal		Final	
Athlete	Event	Points	Rank	Points	Rank	Points	Rank
Mohamed Ramah	Men's trap	108	30	Did not advance			
Mohamed Ramah	Men's double trap	115	21	Did not advance			

Qualification Legend: Q = Qualify for the next round; q = Qualify for the bronze medal (shotgun)

== Swimming ==
Morocco has received a Universality invitation from FINA to send two swimmers (one male and one female) to the Olympics.

Athlete	Event	Heat		Semifinal		Final	
Athlete	Event	Time	Rank	Time	Rank	Time	Rank
Driss Lahrichi	Men's 100 m backstroke	58.01	36	Did not advance			
Noura Mana	Women's 50 m freestyle	28.20	59	Did not advance			

== Taekwondo ==
Morocco entered one athlete into the taekwondo competition at the Olympics. Omar Hajjami, Hakima El-Meslahy, and 2012 Olympian Wiam Dislam secured the spots on the Moroccan team respectively in the men's flyweight (58 kg), women's lightweight (57 kg), and women's heavyweight category (+67 kg) by virtue of their top two finish at the 2016 African Qualification Tournament in Agadir.

Athlete	Event	Round of 16	Quarterfinals	Semifinals	Repechage	Final / BM	
Athlete	Event	Opposition Result	Opposition Result	Opposition Result	Opposition Result	Opposition Result	Rank
Omar Hajjami	Men's −58 kg	Ashourzadeh (IRI); W 4–3	Zhao S (CHN); L 1–8	Did not advance	Tortosa (ESP); L 1–4	Did not advance	7
Naima Bakkal	Women's −57 kg	Jones (GBR); L 4–12	Did not advance		Asemani (BEL); L 0–12 PTG	Did not advance	7
Wiam Dislam	Women's +67 kg	Rodríguez (DOM); W 5–1	Espinoza (MEX); L 2–3 SUD	Did not advance	Alora (PHI); W 7–5	Walkden (GBR); L 1–7	5

== Weightlifting ==
Morocco has qualified one male weightlifter for the Rio Olympics by virtue of a top five national finish at the 2016 African Championships, signifying the nation's Olympic return to the sport for the first time since 2004. Meanwhile, an unused women's Olympic spot was added to the Moroccan weightlifting team by IWF, as a response to the vacancy of women's quota places in the individual World Rankings and to the "multiple positive cases" of doping on several nations. The team must allocate these places to individual athletes by June 20, 2016.

Athlete	Event	Snatch		Clean & jerk		Total	Rank
Athlete	Event	Result	Rank	Result	Rank	Total	Rank
Khalid El-Aabidi	Men's −85 kg	120	22	165	20	285	20
Samira Ouass	Women's –75 kg	75	14	97	14	172	14

== Wrestling ==
Morocco has qualified three wrestlers for each of the following weight classes into the Olympic competition, as a result of their semifinal triumphs at the 2016 African & Oceania Qualification Tournament.

Key:

- VT – Victory by Fall.
- PP – Decision by Points – the loser with technical points.
- PO – Decision by Points – the loser without technical points.
- ST – Technical superiority – the loser without technical points and a margin of victory of at least 8 (Greco-Roman) or 10 (freestyle) points.
- SP – Technical superiority – the loser with technical points and a margin of victory of at least 8 (Greco-Roman) or 10 (freestyle) points.

Men's freestyle

Athlete	Event	Qualification	Round of 16	Quarterfinal	Semifinal	Repechage 1	Repechage 2	Final / BM	
Athlete	Event	Opposition Result	Opposition Result	Opposition Result	Opposition Result	Opposition Result	Opposition Result	Opposition Result	Rank
Chakir Ansari	−57 kg	Lachinau (BLR); L 1–4 ^{SP}	Did not advance						13

Men's Greco-Roman

Athlete	Event	Qualification	Round of 16	Quarterfinal	Semifinal	Repechage 1	Repechage 2	Final / BM	
Athlete	Event	Opposition Result	Opposition Result	Opposition Result	Opposition Result	Opposition Result	Opposition Result	Opposition Result	Rank
Mehdi Messaoudi	−59 kg	Bye	Thielke (USA); L 0–4 ^{ST}	Did not advance					17
Zied Ayet Ikram	−75 kg	Bye	Yang B (CHN); L 0–3 ^{PO}	Did not advance					19

== See also ==
- Morocco at the 2016 Summer Paralympics
