= 2015 AIBA World Boxing Championships – Middleweight =

Boxing competitions

The light welterweight competition at the 2015 AIBA World Boxing Championships will be held from 6–14 October 2015. This is a qualifying tournament for the upcoming 2016 Summer Olympics. Arlen López of Cuba defeated Bektemir Melikuziev of Uzbekistan to win the world title.

== Medalists ==
Gold	Arlen López (CUB)
Silver	Bektemir Melikuziev (UZB)
Bronze	Hosam Abdin (EGY)
Bronze	Michael O'Reilly (IRL)

== Seeds ==
1. (Cuba) Arlen López
2. (Kazakhstan) Zhanibek Alimkhanuly (quarterfinals)
3. (Russia) Petr Khamukov (quarterfinals)
4. (Poland) Tomasz Jablonski (round of 16)

== Draw ==
=== Finals ===
Semifinals
1	Arlen López (CUB)	3
4	Hosam Abdin (EGY)	0
3	Bektemir Melikuziev (UZB)	2
2	Michael O'Reilly (IRL)	1

Final
Arlen López (CUB)	2
Bektemir Melikuziev (UZB)	1

==== Section 1 ====
Round of 32
Zibani Chikanda (BOT)	0
Aljaz Venko (SLO)	3
Salvatore Cavallaro (ITA)	1
Anthony Campbell (USA)	2
Yahia El-Mekachari (TUN)	0
Max van der Pas (NED)	3
Vikas Krishan Yadav (IND)	3
Zoltán Harcsa (HUN)	0

Round of 16
Arlen López (CUB)	3
Aljaz Venko (SLO)	0
Anthony Campbell (USA)	1
Marlo Delgado (ECU)	2
Hosam Abdin (EGY)	3
Max van der Pas (NED)	0
Vikas Krishan Yadav (IND)	2
Tomasz Jablonski (POL)	1

Quarterfinals
Arlen López (CUB)	3
Marlo Delgado (ECU)	0
Hosam Abdin (EGY)	3
Vikas Krishan Yadav (IND)	0

Semifinals
Arlen López (CUB)	3
Hosam Abdin (EGY)	0

==== Section 2 ====
Round of 32
Endry Saavedra Pinto (VEN)	3
Alhadi Abdulrahman (QAT)	0
Zaal Kvachatadze (GEO)
Bektemir Melikuziev (UZB)	KO
Valeriy Kharlamov (UKR)	0
Daniel Lewis (AUS)	3
Misael Rodríguez (MEX)	3
Aphisit Kanankhokkhruea (THA)	0

Round of 16
Petr Khamukov (RUS)	3
Endry Saavedra Pinto (VEN)	0
Bektemir Melikuziev (UZB)	2
Christian Mbilli Assomo (FRA)	1
Daniel Lewis (AUS)	0
Michael O'Reilly (IRL)	3
Misael Rodríguez (MEX)	0
Zhanibek Alimkhanuly (KAZ)	3

Quarterfinals
Petr Khamukov (RUS)	1
Bektemir Melikuziev (UZB)	2
Michael O'Reilly (IRL)	2
Zhanibek Alimkhanuly (KAZ)	1

Semifinals
Bektemir Melikuziev (UZB)	2
Michael O'Reilly (IRL)	1

== Results ==
=== Ranking ===
Rank	Athlete
1st place, gold medalist(s)	Arlen López (CUB)
2nd place, silver medalist(s)	Bektemir Melikuziev (UZB)
3rd place, bronze medalist(s)	Hosam Abdin (EGY)
3rd place, bronze medalist(s)	Michael O'Reilly (IRL)
5	Marlo Delgado (ECU)
5	Vikas Krishan Yadav (IND)
5	Petr Khamukov (RUS)
5	Zhanibek Alimkhanuly (KAZ)
9	Aljaz Venko (SLO)
9	Anthony Campbell (USA)
9	Max van der Pas (NED)
9	Tomasz Jablonski (POL)
9	Endry Saavedra Pinto (VEN)
9	Christian Mbilli Assomo (FRA)
9	Daniel Lewis (AUS)
9	Misael Rodríguez (MEX)
17	Zibani Chikanda (BOT)
17	Salvatore Cavallaro (ITA)
17	Yahia El-Mekachari (TUN)
17	Zoltán Harcsa (HUN)
17	Alhadi Abdulrahman (QAT)
17	Zaal Kvachatadze (GEO)
17	Valeriy Kharlamov (UKR)
17	Aphisit Kanankhokkhruea (THA)
