= Boxing at the 2016 Summer Olympics – Men's middleweight =

Men's middleweight boxing at the Games of the XXXI Olympiad
- Venue: Riocentro – Pavilion 6
- Date: 8–20 August 2016
- Competitors: 28 from 28 nations

Medalists
1st place, gold medalist(s)		Arlen López	Cuba
2nd place, silver medalist(s)		Bektemir Melikuziev	Uzbekistan
3rd place, bronze medalist(s)		Kamran Shakhsuvarly	Azerbaijan
3rd place, bronze medalist(s)		Misael Rodríguez	Mexico

The men's middleweight boxing competition at the 2016 Summer Olympics in Rio de Janeiro was held from 8 to 20 August at the Riocentro.

== Schedule ==
All times are Brasília Time (UTC−3).

Date	Time	Round
Monday, 8 August 2016	12:43	Round of 32
Tuesday, 9 August 2016	12:04	Round of 32
Friday, 12 August 2016	13:14	Round of 16
Monday, 15 August 2016	12:55	Quarter-finals
Thursday, 18 August 2016	15:00	Semi-finals
Saturday, 20 August 2016	15:00	Final

== Results ==
=== Finals ===
Semi-finals
Arlen López (CUB)	3
Kamran Shakhsuvarly (AZE)	0
Misael Rodríguez (MEX)	0
Bektemir Melikuziev (UZB)	3

Final
Arlen López (CUB)	3
Bektemir Melikuziev (UZB)	0

=== Top half ===
Round of 32
Zoltán Harcsa (HUN)	2
Arslanbek Açilow (TKM)	1
Christian Mbilli Assomo (FRA)	3
Dmytro Mytrofanov (UKR)	0
Endry José Pinto (VEN)	0
Marlo Delgado (ECU)	3
Zhanibek Alimkhanuly (KAZ)	3
Antony Fowler (GBR)	0
Ilyas Abbadi (ALG)	3
Anauel Ngamissengue (CGO)	0
Zhao Minggang (CHN)	0
Kamran Shakhsuvarly (AZE)	3

Round of 16
Arlen López (CUB)	TKO
Zoltán Harcsa (HUN)
Christian Mbilli Assomo (FRA)	2
Marlo Delgado (ECU)	1
Zhanibek Alimkhanuly (KAZ)	3
Ilyas Abbadi (ALG)	0
Kamran Shakhsuvarly (AZE)	2
Artem Chebotarev (RUS)	1

Quarter-finals
Arlen López (CUB)	3
Christian Mbilli Assomo (FRA)	0
Zhanibek Alimkhanuly (KAZ)	1
Kamran Shakhsuvarly (AZE)	2

Semi-finals
Arlen López (CUB)	3
Kamran Shakhsuvarly (AZE)	0

=== Bottom half ===
Round of 32
Misael Rodríguez (MEX)	3
Waheed Abdul-Ridha (IRQ)	0
Wilfried Ntsengue (CMR)	2
Jorge Vivas (COL)	1
Merven Clair (MRI)	0
Hosam Bakr Abdin (EGY)	3
Vikas Krishan Yadav (IND)	3
Charles Conwell (USA)	0
Önder Şipal (TUR)	2
Benny Muziyo (ZAM)	1
Tomasz Jabłoński (POL)	1
Daniel Lewis (AUS)	2

Round of 16
Michael O'Reilly (IRL)	DSQ^{1}
Misael Rodríguez (MEX)
Wilfried Ntsengue (CMR)	0
Hosam Bakr Abdin (EGY)	3
Vikas Krishan Yadav (IND)	3
Önder Şipal (TUR)	0
Daniel Lewis (AUS)	0
Bektemir Melikuziev (UZB)	3

Quarter-finals
Misael Rodríguez (MEX)	3
Hosam Bakr Abdin (EGY)	0
Vikas Krishan Yadav (IND)	0
Bektemir Melikuziev (UZB)	3

Semi-finals
Misael Rodríguez (MEX)	0
Bektemir Melikuziev (UZB)	3

^{1} O'Reilly was ejected from the competition after being suspended when a sample he provided prior to coming to Rio tested positive for a banned substance.
