= Boxing at the 2015 African Games =

Boxing competitions

- Location: (Republic of the Congo) Brazzaville
- Dates: 6–12 September

Boxing at the 2015 African Games in Brazzaville was held from 6 to 12 September 2015.

== Results ==
=== Men's events ===
Event	Gold	Silver	Bronze
Light flyweight (49kg)	Francel Moussiesse; Republic of the Congo	Mathias Hamunyela; Namibia	Sibusiso Bandla; South Africa Feysel Mohamed Zrgaw; Ethiopia
Flyweight (52kg)	Mohamed Flissi; Algeria	Sankuru Nkolomoni; Democratic Republic of the Congo	Junior Mikamou; Gabon Moroke Mokhotho; Lesotho
Bantamweight (56kg)	Bilel Mhamdi; Tunisia	Khalil Litim; Algeria	Hesham Mahmoud Abdelaal; Egypt Pedro Gomes; Angola
Lightweight (60kg)	Reda Benbaziz; Algeria	Fatoui Sarouna; Togo	Nick Okoth; Kenya Mulaja Mulaj; Democratic Republic of the Congo
Light welterweight (64kg)	Abdelkader Chadi; Algeria	Jonas Jonas; Namibia	Kagiso Bagwasi; Botswana Eslam Aly; Egypt
Welterweight (69kg)	Oluwafemi Oyeleye; Nigeria	Salif Msangou Njikam; Cameroon	Jean-Luc Rosalba; Mauritius Cédric Massala; Republic of the Congo
Middleweight (75kg)	Wilfried Ntsengue; Cameroon	Glory L'Muala; Democratic Republic of the Congo	Benny Muziyo; Zambia Zibani Chikanda; Botswana
Light heavyweight (81kg)	Abdelhafid Benchabla; Algeria	Abdelrahman Oraby; Egypt	Kennedy Katende; Uganda Ulrich Yombo; Cameroon
Heavyweight (91kg)	Kennedy St-Pierre; Mauritius	Efetobor Wesley Apochi; Nigeria	David Akankolim; Ghana Elly Ajowi; Kenya
Super heavyweight (+91kg)	Efe Ajagba; Nigeria	Keddy Agnes; Seychelles	Issa Ahmed Madian; Egypt Mohamed Grimes; Algeria

=== Women's events ===
Event	Gold	Silver	Bronze
Flyweight (51kg)	Souhila Bouchene; Algeria	Caroline Linus; Nigeria	Bathabile Ziqubu; South Africa Rim Jouini; Tunisia
Lightweight (60kg)	Kehinde Obareh; Nigeria	Khouloud Hlimi; Tunisia	Ayat Elsaid Abdellah; Egypt Elhem Mekhaled; Algeria
Middleweight (75kg)	Edith Ogoke; Nigeria	Rana Abdelhamid; Egypt	Rady Gramane; Mozambique Yannick Azengue; Cameroon

== Medal table ==
* Host nation (Republic of the Congo)

Rank	Nation	Gold	Silver	Bronze	Total
1	Algeria (ALG)	5	1	2	8
2	Nigeria (NGR)	4	2	0	6
3	Cameroon (CMR)	1	1	2	4
4	Tunisia (TUN)	1	1	1	3
5	Mauritius (MRI)	1	0	1	2
5	Republic of the Congo (CGO)*	1	0	1	2
7	Egypt (EGY)	0	2	4	6
8	Democratic Republic of the Congo (COD)	0	2	1	3
9	Namibia (NAM)	0	2	0	2
10	Seychelles (SEY)	0	1	0	1
10	Togo (TOG)	0	1	0	1
12	Botswana (BOT)	0	0	2	2
12	Kenya (KEN)	0	0	2	2
12	South Africa (RSA)	0	0	2	2
15	Angola (ANG)	0	0	1	1
15	Ethiopia (ETH)	0	0	1	1
15	Gabon (GAB)	0	0	1	1
15	Ghana (GHA)	0	0	1	1
15	Lesotho (LES)	0	0	1	1
15	Mozambique (MOZ)	0	0	1	1
15	Uganda (UGA)	0	0	1	1
15	Zambia (ZAM)	0	0	1	1
Totals (22 entries)		13	13	26	52
