= Boxing at the 2016 Summer Olympics – Men's light flyweight =

Boxing competitions

Men's light flyweight boxing at the Games of the XXXI Olympiad
- Venue: Riocentro – Pavilion 6
- Date: 6–14 August 2016
- Competitors: 22 from 22 nations

Medalists
1st place, gold medalist(s)		Hasanboy Dusmatov	Uzbekistan
2nd place, silver medalist(s)		Yuberjen Martínez	Colombia
3rd place, bronze medalist(s)		Joahnys Argilagos	Cuba
3rd place, bronze medalist(s)		Nico Hernández	United States

The men's light flyweight boxing competition at the 2016 Summer Olympics in Rio de Janeiro was held from 6 to 14 August at the Riocentro.

== Competition format ==
Like all Olympic boxing events, the competition was a straight single-elimination tournament. This event consisted of 22 boxers who had qualified for the competition through various qualifying tournaments held in 2015 and 2016. The competition began with a preliminary round on 6 August, where the number of competitors was reduced to 16, and concluded with the final on 14 August. As there were fewer than 32 boxers in the competition, a number of boxers received a bye through the preliminary round. Both semi-final losers were awarded bronze medals.

All bouts consisted of three three-minute rounds. Beginning this year, the competition was scored using the "must-ten" scoring system.

== Schedule ==
All times are Brasília Time (UTC−3).

Date	Time	Round
Saturday 6 August 2016	11:00 & 17:00	Round of 32
Monday 8 August 2016	11:00 & 17:00	Round of 16
Wednesday 10 August 2016	11:00 & 17:00	Quarterfinals
Friday 12 August 2016	12:00	Semifinals
Sunday 14 August 2016	14:15	Final

== Results ==
=== Finals ===
Semi-finals
Joahnys Argilagos (CUB)	1
Yuberjen Martínez (COL)	2
Hasanboy Dusmatov (UZB)	3
Nico Hernández (USA)	0

Final
Yuberjen Martínez (COL)	0
Hasanboy Dusmatov (UZB)	3

=== Top half ===
Round of 32
Simplice Fotsala (CMR)	0
Galal Yafai (GBR)	3
Patrick Lourenço (BRA)	0
Yuberjen Martínez (COL)	3
Artur Hovhannisyan (ARM)	0
Samuel Carmona (ESP)	3

Round of 16
Joahnys Argilagos (CUB)	2
Galal Yafai (GBR)	1
Peter Mungai Warui (KEN)	2
Lü Bin (CHN)	1
Rogen Ladon (PHI)	0
Yuberjen Martínez (COL)	3
Samuel Carmona (ESP)	2
Paddy Barnes (IRL)	1

Quarter-finals
Joahnys Argilagos (CUB)	3
Peter Mungai Warui (KEN)	0
Yuberjen Martínez (COL)	2
Samuel Carmona (ESP)	1

Semi-finals
Joahnys Argilagos (CUB)	1
Yuberjen Martínez (COL)	2

=== Bottom half ===
Round of 32
Leandro Blanc (ARG)	0
Joselito Velázquez (MEX)	3
Mathias Hamunyela (NAM)	3
Rufat Huseynov (AZE)	0
Nico Hernández (USA)	3
Manuel Cappai (ITA)	0

Round of 16
Hasanboy Dusmatov (UZB)	3
Joselito Velázquez (MEX)	0
Mathias Hamunyela (NAM)	0
Birzhan Zhakypov (KAZ)	3
Gankhuyagiin Gan-Erdene (MGL)	0
Carlos Quipo (ECU)	3
Nico Hernández (USA)	3
Vasily Yegorov (RUS)	0

Quarter-finals
Hasanboy Dusmatov (UZB)	3
Birzhan Zhakypov (KAZ)	0
Carlos Quipo (ECU)	0
Nico Hernández (USA)	3

Semi-finals
Hasanboy Dusmatov (UZB)	3
Nico Hernández (USA)	0
