= Abdelaal =

Abdelaal is a surname. Notable people with the surname include:

- Ahmed Abdelaal (born 1989), Egyptian volleyball player
- Mahmoud Abdelaal (born 1992), Egyptian boxer
- Mohamed Abdelaal (born 1990), Egyptian judoka

== See also ==
- Reda Abdel Aal (born 1965), Egyptian football player then coach
