= 2015 African Amateur Boxing Championships =

Boxing competitions

- Host city: Casablanca
- Country: Morocco
- Nations: 19
- Athletes: 103
- Events: 10
- Dates: August 18–23, 2015
- Main venue: Mohammed V Athletic Center

The 2015 African Amateur Boxing Championships were held at the Mohammed V Athletic Center in Casablanca, Morocco from 18 to 23 August 2015. It was the 18th edition of this event organised by the African governing body for amateur boxing, the African Boxing Confederation (AFBC).

== Schedule ==
| Date | Round |
|---|---|
| 18–19 August 2015 | Preliminaries |
| 20–21 August 2015 | Quarterfinals |
| 22 August 2015 | Semifinals |
| 23 August 2015 | Finals |

== Medal winners ==
| Event | Gold | Silver | Bronze |
|---|---|---|---|
| Light Flyweight (–49 kg) | Imad Ahayoun (MAR) | Sulemanu Tetteh (GHA) | Tefo Rammupudu (BOT) Fazil Kaggwa (UGA) |
| Flyweight (–52 kg) | Mohamed Flissi (ALG) | Achraf Kharroubi (MAR) | Mountasar Bouali (TUN) Akimos Annang Ampiah (GHA) |
| Bantamweight (–56 kg) | Mohamed Hamout (MAR) | Bilel Mhamdi (TUN) | Khalil Litim (ALG) Rogers Semitala (UGA) |
| Lightweight (–60 kg) | Reda Benbaziz (ALG) | Mahmoud Abdelaal (EGY) | Ahmed Mejri (TUN) Hassan Abdu (UGA) |
| Light Welterweight (–64 kg) | Abdelkader Chadi (ALG) | Abdelhak Aatkani (MAR) | Richarno Colin (MRI) Kagiso Bagwasi (BOT) |
| Welterweight (–69 kg) | Mohammed Rabii (MAR) | Walid Sedik Mohamed (EGY) | Mohamed Amine Meskini (TUN) Musah Rahman Lawson (GHA) |
| Middleweight (–75 kg) | Hosam Bakr Abdin (EGY) | Zibani Chikanda (BOT) | Yahya Mekacheri (TUN) John Koudeha (TOG) |
| Light Heavyweight (–81 kg) | Abdelhafid Benchabla (ALG) | Abdelrahman Oraby (EGY) | Thabang Motsewabeng (BOT) Hassan Saada (MAR) |
| Heavyweight (–91 kg) | Abdeljalil Abouhamada (MAR) | Chouaib Bouloudinat (ALG) | Willy Kyakonye (UGA) David Akankolim (GHA) |
| Super Heavyweight (+91 kg) | Mohamed Arjaoui (MAR) | Mohamed Grimes (ALG) | Keddy Agnes (SEY) Mike Sekabembe (UGA) |

=== Medal table ===
Below is the final medal table from the championships. The event was dominated by Morocco and Algeria, with the two nations combining to win nine of the ten available gold medals. Morocco won the most gold medals, with five, as well as the most total medals, with eight.

| Rank | Nation | Gold | Silver | Bronze | Total |
|---|---|---|---|---|---|
| 1 | Morocco | 5 | 2 | 1 | 8 |
| 2 | Algeria | 4 | 2 | 0 | 6 |
| 3 | Egypt | 1 | 3 | 0 | 4 |
| 4 | Tunisia | 0 | 1 | 4 | 5 |
| 5 | Botswana | 0 | 1 | 3 | 4 |
| 6 | Ghana | 0 | 1 | 0 | 1 |
| 7 | Uganda | 0 | 0 | 5 | 5 |
| 8 | Mauritius | 0 | 0 | 1 | 1 |
| 8 | Seychelles | 0 | 0 | 1 | 1 |
| 8 | Togo | 0 | 0 | 1 | 1 |
| Totals (10 entries) | | 10 | 10 | 16 | 36 |
