= Arlen López =

Cuban boxer (born 1993)

Personal information
- Born: Arlen López Cardona; 21 February 1993 (age 33) Guantánamo, Cuba
- Height: 5 ft 10 in (178 cm)
- Weight: Light heavyweight; Middleweight

Boxing career

Boxing record
- Total fights: 2
- Wins: 2
- Win by KO: 2
Medal record
Men's amateur boxing
Representing Cuba
Olympic Games
Gold medal – first place	2016 Rio Janeiro	Middleweight
Gold medal – first place	2020 Tokyo	Light-heavyweight
Bronze medal – third place	2024 Paris	Middleweight
IBA World Championships
Gold medal – first place	2015 Doha	Middleweight
Bronze medal – third place	2025 Dubai	Light heavyweight
Pan American Games
Gold medal – first place	2015 Toronto	Middleweight
Gold medal – first place	2019 Lima	Middleweight
Gold medal – first place	2023 Santiago	Middleweight
Pan American Championship
Gold medal – first place	2017 Tegucigalpa	Middleweight
Central American and Caribbean Games
Gold medal – first place	2014 Veracruz	Middleweight
Silver medal – second place	2018 Barranquilla	Middleweight
Bronze medal – third place	2023 San Salvador	Middleweight
World Junior Championships
Gold medal – first place	2009 Yerevan	Featherweight

Arlen López Cardona (born 21 February 1993) is a Cuban professional boxer. López was a highly accomplished amateur, winning gold medals at both the 2016 and 2020 Summer Olympics. López also won gold medals at both the 2015 and 2019 Pan American Games, the 2014 and 2018 Central American and Caribbean Games and the 2015 World Championships. As a professional, he has qualified for his third Olympics in 2024.

== Amateur career ==
=== Olympic results ===
Rio 2016

- Round of 16: Defeated Zoltán Harcsa (Hungary) TKO
- Quarter-finals: Defeated Christian M'billi (France) 3–0
- Semi-finals: Defeated Kamran Shakhsuvarly (Azerbaijan) 3–0
- Final: Defeated Bektemir Melikuziev (Uzbekistan) 3–0

Tokyo 2020

- Round of 16: Defeated Mohammed Houmri (Algeria) 5–0
- Quarter-finals: Defeated Rogelio Romero (Mexico) 5–0
- Semi-finals: Defeated Loren Alfonso (Azerbaijan) 5–0
- Final: Defeated Benjamin Whittaker (Great Britain) 4–1

=== World Championship results ===
Doha 2015

- Round of 16: Defeated Aljaz Venko (Slovenia) 3–0
- Quarter-finals: Defeated Marlo Delgado (Ecuador) 3–0
- Semi-finals: Defeated Hosam Bakr Abdin (Egypt) 3–0
- Final: Defeated Bektemir Melikuziev (Uzbekistan) 2–1

Hamburg 2017

- Round of 16: Defeated Salvatore Cavallaro (Italy) 5–0
- Quarter-finals: Defeated by Abilkhan Amankul (Kazakhstan) 3–2

Yekaterinburg 2019

- Second round: Defeated Younes Nemouchi (Algeria) 5–0
- Third round: Defeated Euri Cedeño (Dominican Republic) 4–1
- Quarter-finals: Defeated by Gleb Bakshi (Russia) 3–2

=== Pan American Games results ===
Toronto 2015

- Quarter-finals: Defeated Jason Ramírez (Costa Rica) 3–0
- Semi-finals: Defeated Endry Saaverda (Venezuela) 3–0
- Final: Defeated Jorge Vivas (Colombia) 3–0

Lima 2019

- Quarter-finals: Defeated Euri Cedeño (Dominican Republic) 4–1
- Semi-finals: Defeated Lesther Espino (Nicaragua) 5–0
- Final: Defeated Hebert Conceição (Brazil) 5–0

== Professional career ==
=== Early career ===
In April 2022, it was announced that Cuban amateur boxers would have the ability to fight professionally abroad for the first time since 1962, negating the need for boxers to defect from the country. López made his professional debut against Fernando Galvan on 20 May 2022. López won the bout the after knocking his opponent out with a left hook in the opening round.

== Professional boxing record ==
2 fights	2 wins	0 losses
By knockout	2	0
By decision	0	0

No.	Result	Record	Opponent	Type	Round, time	Date	Location	Notes
2	Win	2–0	Francisco Rios Amezquita	TKO	1 (8), 2:58	10 Sep 2022	Grand Hotel, Tijuana, Mexico	
1	Win	1–0	Fernando Galvan	KO	1 (6), 1:34	20 May 2022	Palenque de la FNSM, Aguascalientes, Mexico	
