= Boxing at the 2018 Mediterranean Games – Men's bantamweight =

Boxing competitions

Men's bantamweight boxing at the 2018 Mediterranean Games
- Venue: Torredembarra Pavilion
- Date: 26–30 June 2018
- Competitors: 11 from 11 nations

Medalists
gold medal	Raffaele Di Serio	Italy
silver medal	Krenar Zeneli	Albania
bronze medal	Bilel Mhamdi	Tunisia
bronze medal	Ali İhsan Alagaş	Turkey

The men's Bantamweight competition of the boxing events at the 2018 Mediterranean Games in Tarragona, Spain, was held between June 26 and 30 at the Torredembarra Pavilion.

Like all Mediterranean Games boxing events, the competition was a straight single-elimination tournament. Both semifinal losers were awarded bronze medals, so no boxers competed again after their first loss.

== Schedule ==
All times are Central European Summer Time (UTC+2).

Date	Time	Round
June 26, 2018	18:30	Round of 16
June 28, 2018	16:00	Quarterfinals
June 29, 2018	16:00	Semifinals
June 30, 2018	16:30	Final

== Results ==
=== Bracket ===
Round of 16
Besfort Merlaku (KOS)	0
Raffaele Di Serio (ITA)	5
Alen Rahimic (BIH)	0
Krenar Zeneli (ALB)	5
José Quiles (ESP)	2
Taoufik Kachfi (MAR)	3

Quarterfinals
Jordan Rodriguez (FRA)	2
Raffaele Di Serio (ITA)	3
Bilel Mhamdi (TUN)	5
Abdelrahim Ahmed (EGY)	0
Khalil Litim (ALG)	2
Krenar Zeneli (ALB)	3
Taoufik Kachfi (MAR)	0
Ali İhsan Alagaş (TUR)	4

Semifinals
Raffaele Di Serio (ITA)	3
Bilel Mhamdi (TUN)	2
Krenar Zeneli (ALB)	4
Ali İhsan Alagaş (TUR)	1

Finals
Raffaele Di Serio (ITA)	5
Krenar Zeneli (ALB)	0
