= Oluwafemi Oyeleye =

Nigerian boxer (born 1994)

Personal information
- Nationality: Nigerian
- Born: 21 October 1994 (age 31) Lagos, Nigeria
- Height: 1.83 m (6 ft 0 in)
- Weight: Light-middleweight

Boxing career

Boxing record
- Total fights: 17
- Wins: 17
- Win by KO: 11
- Losses: 0
Medal record
Men's amateur boxing
Representing Nigeria
African Games
Gold medal – first place	2015 Brazzaville	Welterweight

Oluwafemi Oyeleye Nisty (born 21 October 1994) is a Nigerian professional boxer. As an amateur he won a gold medal in the men's welterweight event at the 2015 African Games.

== Professional career ==
Oyeleye signed his professional contract with Mayweather Promotions in November 2016. On 26 September 2018, he signed JAB Management International Inc.

== Professional boxing record ==
17 fights	17 wins	0 losses
By knockout	11	0
By decision	6	0

No.	Result	Record	Opponent	Type	Round, time	Date	Location	Notes
17	Win	17-0	(Dominican Republic) Braulio Rodríguez	KO	1 (6) 1:47	10 May 2025	(United States) Hard Rock Hotel & Casino, Atlantic City, New Jersey, US	
16	Win	16-0	(Spain) Leonardo Di Stefano	TKO	4 (8) 0:42	22 Jun 2024	(United States) 2300 Arena, Philadelphia, Pennsylvania, US	
15	Win	15-0	(Colombia) Wilfrido Buelvas	TKO	2 (8) 2:03	17 Feb 2024	(United States) 2300 Arena, Philadelphia, Pennsylvania, US	
14	Win	14-0	(United States) Jimmy Williams	TKO	3 (6) 2:08	29 Sep 2023	(United States) 2300 Arena, Philadelphia, Pennsylvania, US	
13	Win	13-0	(Argentina) Javier Francisco Maciel	TKO	4 (4) 0:29	22 Jul 2023	(United States) 2300 Arena, Philadelphia, Pennsylvania, US	
12	Win	12-0	(Mexico) Nestor Fernando Garcia	TKO	2 (8) 2:41	15 Nov 2019	Quartz Hotel, Tijuana, Mexico	
11	Win	11-0	(Mexico) Jose Ramon Meza	TKO	5 (8) 1:10	11 May 2019	Auditorio Fausto Gutierrez Moreno, Tijuana, Mexico	
10	Win	10-0	(Mexico) Juan Ramon Guzman	UD	6	1 Mar 2019	Auditorio Fausto Gutierrez Moreno, Tijuana, Mexico	
9	Win	9-0	(Ghana) Victus Kemavor	KO	2 (8) 0:59	28 Dec 2018	Tafawa Balewa Square, Lagos Nigeria	
8	Win	8-0	(Mexico) Jesus Alberto Beltran	MD	6	9 Nov 2018	Grand Hotel, Tijuana, Mexico	
7	Win	7-0	(Mexico) Juan Andres Armendariz	KO	1 (4) 0:42	6 Oct 2018	Gasmart Stadium, Tijuana, Mexico	
6	Win	6-0	(Mexico) Ricardo Dorado	TKO	1 (6) 1:55	21 Sep 2018	Grand Hotel, Tijuana, Mexico	
5	Win	5-0	(Mexico) Carlos Lozano	UD	6	27 Jan 2018	(United States) Sam's Town Hotel and Gambling Hall, Sunrise Manor, Nevada, US	
4	Win	4-0	(United States) Brandon Adams	UD	6	18 Nov 2017	(United States) Cosmopolitan of Las Vegas, Paradise, Nevada, US	
3	Win	3-0	(Mexico) Uriel Gonzalez	KO	1 (4) 1:02	30 Jul 2017	(United States) Rabobank Theater, Bakersfield, California, US	
2	Win	2-0	(Mexico) Adan Ahumada	UD	4	24 Feb 2017	(United States) Pechanga Resort & Casino, Temecula, California, US	
1	Win	1-0	(United States) Brian True	UD	4	2 Dec 2016	(United States) Sam's Town Hotel and Gambling Hall, Sunrise Manor, Nevada, US	
