= Parveen Kumar (boxer) =

Indian boxer

Parveen Kumar (born 25 June 1989) is an Indian boxer who represented India in many international tournaments including the 2014 Commonwealth Games in Glasgow.

Kumar was born in Sonepat, in the Indian state of Haryana. He started boxing in 2008, and competes in the super heavyweight (91kg+) weight category. He earned a silver medal in the Super Heavyweight division of the 2012 Indian National championships in Hyderabad losing 10:7 in the final to Satish Kumar. He also represented Haryana in the national games in Kerala in 2015.

In 2016, he was selected to represent India at the Asia-Oceania Olympic qualifying tournament which takes place in Qian'an, China, from 23 March to 3 April.

He was married on 12 February 2016 to Anjali.
