= Boxing at the 2014 Commonwealth Games – Super heavyweight =

Boxing competitions

Boxing – Super heavyweight at the 2014 Commonwealth Games
- Venue: Scottish Exhibition and Conference Centre
- Dates: 25 July – 2 August 2014
- Competitors: 14 from 14 nations

Medalists
gold medal	Joseph Joyce	England
silver medal	Joseph Goodall	Australia
bronze medal	Mike Sekabembe	Uganda
bronze medal	Efe Ajagba	Nigeria

The Super heavyweight boxing competition at the 2014 Commonwealth Games in Glasgow, Scotland took place between 25 July and 2 August at the Scottish Exhibition and Conference Centre. Super heavyweights are boxers who are over 91 kilograms in weight.

Like all Commonwealth boxing events, the competition was a straight single-elimination tournament. Both semifinal losers were awarded bronze medals, so no boxers competed again after their first loss. Bouts consisted of three rounds of three minutes each, with one-minute breaks between rounds. Punches scored only if the front of the glove made full contact with the front of the head or torso of the opponent. Five judges scored each bout; three of the judges had to signal a scoring punch within one second for the punch to score. The winner of the bout was the boxer who scored the most valid punches by the end of the bout.

== Schedule ==
All times are British Summer Time (UTC+1)

Date	Time	Round
Friday 25 July 2014	13:45	Round of 16
Tuesday 29 July 2014	13:20	Quarter-finals
Friday 1 August 2014	13:40	Semi-finals
Saturday 2 August 2014	19:20	Final

== Medalists ==
Gold	Joseph Joyce; England
Silver	Joseph Goodall; Australia
Bronze	Mike Sekabembe; Uganda
Bronze	Efe Ajagba; Nigeria

== Results ==
Round of 16
Anderson Emmanuel (BAR)	1
Mike Sekabembe (UGA)	2
Parveen Parveen Kumar (IND)	0
Ross Henderson (SCO)	3
Keddy Agnes (SEY)	0
Joseph Joyce (ENG)	3
Uaine Fa Jr (TON)	0
Efe Ajagba (NGR)	3
Paddy Junior Leuii (SAM)	0
Paul Schafer (RSA)	3
Joseph Goodall (AUS)	3
Patrick Mailata (NZL)	0

Quarter-finals
Haruna Osumanu (GHA)	0
Mike Sekabembe (UGA)	3
Ross Henderson (SCO)	0
Joseph Joyce (ENG)	3
Efe Ajagba (NGR)	3
Paul Schafer (RSA)	0
Joseph Goodall (AUS)	3
Kieshno Major (BAH)	0

Semi-finals
Mike Sekabembe (UGA)
Joseph Joyce (ENG)	WO
Efe Ajagba (NGR)	0
Joseph Goodall (AUS)	3

Final
Joseph Joyce (ENG)	KO1
Joseph Goodall (AUS)	0
