= Elizabeth Akinyi =

Kenyan boxer

Personal information
- Nationality: Kenyan
- Born: 25 September 1993 (age 33)
- Weight: Middleweight; Welterweight

Boxing career

Boxing record
- Wins: 1
- Losses: 1

Elizabeth Akinyi is a Kenyan amateur boxer. She made her amateur debut in March 2016, when she was defeated by Goramane Rady. She turned professional in 2023.

After primary schooling at Mid-fountain Primary School in Nairobi and Boro Primary School in Alego, she undertook her secondary education at St. Joseph's Secondary School and St. Mary's in Nairobi. Aged 14, she started boxing at St. John's Sports Society on the outskirts of Korogocho.

Akinyi won a bronze medal at the 2017 African Amateur Boxing Championships. In May 2021 she participated in her first tournament outside Africa, finishing fifth at the Konstantin Korotkov Memorial Boxing Championships in Russia, after having to withdraw from her fight against Maronta Hernandec following a scratch on her gums from a new mouthguard.

She qualified to represent Kenya the 2020 Summer Olympics through a quota place earned through the International Olympic Committee Boxing Task Force Rankings. On 27 July 2021, she faced Mozambique's Alcinda Panguana in the women's welterweight round of 16. The referee stopped the contest in the second round, ending Akinyi's participation in the Games.

At the 2022 IBA Women's World Boxing Championships in Istanbul, Turkey, she lost to Ukraine's Karolina Makhno by unanimous decision.

Akinyi turned professional in September 2023. She won her professional debut the following month, defeating Tanzania's Lucy Macho by unanimous decision in a four-round middleweight bout at Nyayo National Stadium in Nairobi.
