= Inkululeko Suntele =

Lesotho boxer (1994–2017)

Personal information
- Born: 30 April 1994 Maseru, Lesotho
- Died: 27 October 2017 (aged 23) Maseru, Lesotho

Boxing career

Inkululeko Suntele (30 April 1994 – 27 October 2017) was a Mosotho boxer. He competed in the men's bantamweight event at the 2016 Summer Olympics, where he was defeated by Bilel Mhamdi in the first round. He was the flag bearer for Lesotho during the closing ceremony. Suntele was stabbed to death in October 2017. When he dies, he was under the Olympic Solidarity scholarship for the following year’s Commonwealth Games, which were held in Australia.
