= Rayton Okwiri =

Kenyan boxer (born 1986)

Rayton Nduku Okwiri (born 26 March 1986) is a Kenyan boxer who has held the African Boxing Union middleweight title since June 2019. He also qualified to compete at the 2016 Summer Olympics which was held in Rio de Janeiro, Brazil.

Okwiri secured his place in the welterweight event in Rio by winning the gold medal in the 2016 African Boxing Olympic Qualification Tournament. He defeated Ghana's Mohameed Azumah in the semifinals to clinch his place as part of the Kenyan team in Rio before going on to beat Egypt's Walid Sedik Mohamed in the final.

Okwiri made his professional debut on 4 February 2017, defeating Salehe Mkalekwa at the Crowne Plaza Nairobi. He won the African Boxing Union middleweight title in his sixth pro fight on 8 June 2019, beating Hussein Itaba.

== Professional boxing record ==
9 fights	7 wins	1 loss
By knockout	6	1
By decision	1	0
Draws	1	

No.	Result	Record	Opponent	Type	Round, time	Date	Location	Notes
9	Loss	7–1–1	(Democratic Republic of the Congo) Emmany Kalombo	RTD	7 (12), 3:00	30 Jun 2022	The Gallery, Sandton, Johannesburg, South Africa	
8	Win	7–0–1	(Uganda) John Serunjogi	TKO	8 (10)	13 Oct 2021	Mtana Hall, Dar-Es-Salaam, Tanzania	
7	Win	6–0–1	(Colombia) Fidel Monterroza Munoz	KO	2 (8), 2:03	15 Aug 2021	(United States) Thompson's Point Brick South, Portland, Maine	
6	Win	5–0–1	(Tanzania) Hussein Itaba	TKO	3 (10), 1:23	8 Jun 2019	Charter Hall, Nairobi, Kenya	Won vacant African middleweight title
5	Win	4–0–1	(Tanzania) Pascal Kimaru Bruno	TKO	3 (8), 1:54	23 March 2019	Kenyatta International Conference Centre, Nairobi, Kenya	
4	Win	3–0–1	(Kenya) Patrick Amote	TKO	2 (8), 2:59	11 Jul 2018	Kenyatta International Conference Centre, Nairobi, Kenya	
3	Win	2–0–1	(Tanzania) Imani Daudi Kawaya	UD	6	2 Dec 2017	Carnivore Grounds, Nairobi, Kenya	
2	Draw	1–1	(United States) Moshea Aleem	SD	6	19 Oct 2017	(United States) Mayflower Hotel, Washington, D.C.	
1	Win	1–0	(Tanzania) Salehe Mkalekwa	KO	3 (6)	4 Feb 2017	Crowne Plaza Hotel, Nairobi, Kenya	
