= Efe Ajagba =

Nigerian boxer (born 1994)

Personal information
- Nickname: The Silent Roller
- Born: 22 April 1994 (age 32) Ughelli, Delta State, Nigeria
- Height: 1.96 m (6 ft 5 in)
- Weight: Heavyweight

Boxing career
- Reach: 85 in (216 cm)
- Stance: Orthodox

Boxing record
- Total fights: 23
- Wins: 21
- Win by KO: 14
- Losses: 1
- Draws: 1
Medal record
Men's amateur boxing
Representing Nigeria
Commonwealth Games
Bronze medal – third place	2014 Glasgow	Super-heavyweight
African Games
Gold medal – first place	2015 Brazzaville	Super-heavyweight

Efe Ajagba (born 22 April 1994) is a Nigerian professional boxer. As an amateur, he won a gold medal at the 2015 African Games and bronze at the 2014 Commonwealth Games.

== Early life ==
Ajagba was born on 22 April 1994 in Ughelli, Delta State, Nigeria. He formerly worked in a bakery.

== Amateur career ==
Ajagba took up the sport of boxing in 2011 after previously playing football for a club in Ughelli since 2005. He was coached by Anthony Konyegwachie.

Ajagba was selected to compete for the Nigerian team at the 2014 Commonwealth Games held in Glasgow. Competing in the super heavyweight division he defeated Junior Fa of Tonga in the round of 16 and Paul Schafer of South Africa in the quarterfinals. He advanced to the semifinals where he was defeated by Joseph Goodall of Australia, meaning Ajagba won a bronze medal.

At the 2015 African Games held in Brazzaville, Republic of the Congo, Ajagba was selected as the Nigerian entrant in the men's super heavyweight event. He won the gold medal, beating Keddy Angnes of the Seychelles by a score 3–0 in the final.

In 2016 he won the gold medal in the super heavyweight event at the African Boxing Olympic Qualification Tournament held in Yaoundé, Cameroon. By doing so Ajagba qualified to represent Nigeria at the 2016 Summer Olympics to be held in Rio de Janeiro, Brazil. In the first round Ajagba beat Ugandan Michael Sekamembe on points, he defeated Tunisian boxer Aymen Trabelsi in the semifinal to secure his qualification, then in the final he beat Mohamed Arjaoui of Morocco. Ajagba was the only Nigerian boxer of the ten who competed to qualify for Rio through the tournament, leading to claims from Nigeria's coach Konyegwachie that judges had been bribed.

== Professional career ==
After compiling a perfect record of 5–0, on 24 August 2018, Ajagba scored the fastest victory in boxing history in a match against Curtis Harper, winning in one second via disqualification after Harper walked out of the ring in protest over a pay dispute.

After improving to 12–0, on 7 March 2020, Ajagba fought Răzvan Cojanu. In a one-sided fight, Ajagba dismantled his opponent round by round, and managed to score knockdowns in both the eighth and ninth rounds. In the ninth, Cojanu took a knee with 2:25 left in the round, and the referee decided to stop the fight.

In his next fight, Ajagba made his Top Rank debut and fought Jonathan Rice on 19 September 2020. The fight ended up being less entertaining than expected, especially because Ajagba was not throwing a lot of punches. He did however, still do enough to hurt Rice and earn a unanimous decision victory. Ajagba secured another victory in his 15th fight, knocking out Brian Howard in the third round on 10 April 2021.

Ajagba faced off against undefeated Frank Sánchez on 9 October 2021 on the undercard of Tyson Fury vs. Deontay Wilder III. Ajagba was knocked down en route to a unanimous decision defeat, with scores of 98–91, 98–91 and 97–92 for Sánchez.

On 4 November 2023 in Stateline, Nevada, Ajagba faced his old rival Joseph Goodall in a 10-round bout at heavyweight. He won by technical knockout in the fourth round.

Ajagba fought Guido Vianello on 13 April 2024 in Corpus Christi, Texas, USA. He won the fight by split decision.

He faced Charles Martin at Meta Apex in Enterprise, Nevada, USA, on 15 February 2026. Ajagba won by stoppage in the fourth round.

== Professional boxing record ==
23 fights	21 wins	1 loss
By knockout	15	0
By decision	4	1
By disqualification	2	0
Draws	1	

Key to abbreviations used for results
DQ	Disqualification	RTD	Corner retirement
KO	Knockout	SD	Split decision / split draw
MD	Majority decision / majority draw	TD	Technical decision / technical draw
NC	No contest	TKO	Technical knockout
PTS	Points decision	UD	Unanimous decision / unanimous draw

Boxing record
No.	Result	Record	Opponent	Type	Round(s), time	Date	Location	Notes
23	Win	21–1–1	Charles Martin	TKO	4 (10), 1:11	15 Feb 2026	Meta Apex, Enterprise, Nevada, US	
22	Draw	20–1–1	Martin Bakole	MD	10	3 May 2025	Anb Arena, Riyadh, Saudi Arabia	
21	Win	20–1	Guido Vianello	SD	10	13 Apr 2024	American Bank Center, Corpus Christi, Texas, US	Retained WBC Silver heavyweight title
20	Win	19–1	Joseph Goodall	TKO	4 (10), 0:50	4 Nov 2023	Tahoe Blue Event Center, Stateline, Nevada, US	Retained WBC Silver heavyweight title
19	Win	18–1	Zhan Kossobutskiy	DQ	4 (10), 0:33	26 Aug 2023	Hard Rock Hotel & Casino, Tulsa, Oklahoma, US	Won vacant WBC Silver heavyweight title
18	Win	17–1	Stephan Shaw	UD	10	14 Jan 2023	Turning Stone Resort Casino, Verona, California, US	
17	Win	16–1	Jozsef Darmos	TKO	2 (8), 1:15	27 Aug 2022	Hard Rock Hotel & Casino, Tulsa, Oklahoma, US	
16	Loss	15–1	Frank Sánchez	UD	10	9 Oct 2021	T-Mobile Arena, Paradise, Nevada, US	For WBC Continental Americas and WBO-NABO heavyweight titles
15	Win	15–0	Brian Howard	KO	3 (10), 1:29	10 Apr 2021	Osage Casino, Tulsa, Oklahoma, US	
14	Win	14–0	Jonathan Rice	UD	10	19 Sep 2020	MGM Grand Conference Center, Paradise, Nevada, US	
13	Win	13–0	Răzvan Cojanu	TKO	9 (10), 2:46	7 Mar 2020	Barclays Center, New York City, New York, US	
12	Win	12–0	Iago Kiladze	KO	5 (10), 2:09	21 Dec 2019	Toyota Arena, Ontario, California, US	
11	Win	11–0	Ali Eren Demirezen	UD	10	20 Jul 2019	MGM Grand Garden Arena, Paradise, Nevada, US	
10	Win	10–0	Michael Wallisch	TKO	2 (10), 1:40	27 Apr 2019	Cosmopolitan of Las Vegas, Paradise, Nevada, US	
9	Win	9–0	Amir Mansour	RTD	2 (8), 3:00	9 Mar 2019	Dignity Health Sports Park, Carson, California, US	
8	Win	8–0	Santino Turnbow	TKO	1 (6), 2:22	22 Dec 2018	Barclays Center, New York City, New York, US	
7	Win	7–0	Nick Jones	KO	1 (6), 2:25	30 Sep 2018	Citizens Business Bank Arena, Ontario, California, US	
6	Win	6–0	Curtis Harper	DQ	1 (6), 0:01	24 Aug 2018	Minneapolis Armory, Minneapolis, Minnesota, US	Harper was disqualified after leaving the ring
5	Win	5–0	Dell Long	KO	1 (6), 0:35	26 May 2018	Beau Rivage Resort and Casino, Biloxi, Mississippi, US	
4	Win	4–0	Antonio Johnson	KO	1 (6), 1:14	10 Mar 2018	Freeman Coliseum, San Antonio, Texas, US	
3	Win	3–0	Rodney Hernandez	TKO	5 (6), 1:31	4 Nov 2017	Barclays Center, New York City, New York, US	
2	Win	2–0	Luke Lyons	TKO	1 (6), 2:19	21 Oct 2017	Prudential Center, Newark, New Jersey, US	
1	Win	1–0	Tyrell Herndon	KO	1 (6), 1:29	30 Jul 2017	Rabobank Theater, Bakersfield, California, US	
