= Mike Sekabembe =

Ugandan boxer

Personal information
- Nationality: Ugandan
- Born: 1 January 1980 (age 46)

Sport
- Sport: Boxing
- Weight class: Super heavyweight
Medal record
Men's boxing
Representing Uganda
Commonwealth Games
| Bronze medal – third place | 2014 Glasgow | Super heavyweight |

Mike Sekabembe (born 1 January 1980) is a Ugandan boxer. He competed in the super heavyweight category at the 2014 Commonwealth Games where he won a bronze medal.
