= Abdelrahman Oraby =

Egyptian boxer (born 1987)

Abdelrahman Salah
Personal information
- Born: Abdelrahman Salah Oraby; 9 October 1987 (age 38)
- Height: 185 cm (6 ft 1 in)
- Weight: 81 kg (179 lb)

Sport
- Sport: Boxing
- Weight class: Light heavyweight
Medal record
Men's amateur boxing
Representing Egypt
African Games
| Gold medal – first place | 2019 Rabat | Light heavyweight |
| Silver medal – second place | 2015 Brazzaville | Light heavyweight |
African Championships
| Silver medal – second place | 2015 Casablanca | Light heavyweight |
Mediterranean Games
| Gold medal – first place | 2018 Tarragona | Light heavyweight |

Abdelrahman Salah Orabi Abdelgawwad (Arabic: عبد الرحمن صلاح عرابي, born 9 October 1987) is an Egyptian boxer. A continental silver medalist at the 2015 African Games, he competed in the light heavyweight event at the 2016 Summer Olympics. He also competed in the men's light heavyweight event at the 2020 Summer Olympics.
