= Edith Ogoke =

Nigerian boxer (born 1990)

Personal information
- Full name: Edith Agu Ogoke
- Nationality: Nigeria
- Born: 28 August 1990 (age 35) Owerri, Nigeria

Sport
- Sport: Boxing
- Event: Middleweight
Medal record
Women's boxing
Representing Nigeria
Commonwealth Games
| Bronze medal – third place | 2014 Glasgow | Middleweight |
African Games
| Gold medal – first place | 2015 Brazzaville | Middleweight |
- Updated on 27 August 2016

Edith Agu Ogoke (born 28 August 1990 in Owerri) is a Nigerian female boxer. At the 2012 Summer Olympics, she competed in the Women's middleweight competition, but was defeated in the second round.

At the 2014 Commonwealth Games, she won a bronze medal, beating Shiromali Weerarathna before losing to Savannah Marshall.
