= Zohir Kedache =

Algerian boxer (born 1986)

Personal information
- Born: 2 March 1986 (age 40)

Boxing career

Zohir Kedache (born 2 March 1986) is an Algerian boxer. He competed in the men's welterweight event at the 2016 Summer Olympics.
