= Kennedy Katende =

Ugandan boxer (born 1985)

Personal information
- Nationality: Sweden; Uganda
- Born: 15 March 1985 (age 41) Kampala, Uganda

Sport
- Sport: Boxing
- Event: Light heavyweight
Medal record
Men's Boxing
Representing Uganda
African Games
Bronze medal – third place	2015 Brazzaville	Light heavyweight
- Updated on 28 August 2016

Kennedy Katende (born 15 March 1985) is an Ugandan boxer from Kampala who qualified for the 2008 Olympics in the light-heavyweight division.

His second place behind Kenneth Egan was good enough, and he benefitted from his compatriot Badou Jack's decision to fight for Gambia.

In the 2016 Rio Olympics he fought for the country of his birth Uganda.

== Professional boxing record ==
4 fights	4 wins	0 losses
By knockout	1	0
By decision	3	0

No.	Result	Record	Opponent	Type	Round, time	Date	Location	Notes
4	Win	4–0	(United States) Luther Smith	SD	6	Apr 21, 2018	(United States) Kings Theatre, New York City, New York, U.S.	
3	Win	3–0	(Ukraine) Lyubomyr Pinchuk	UD	6	Jan 26, 2018	(United States) SugarHouse Casino, Philadelphia, Pennsylvania, U.S.	
2	Win	2–0	(Croatia) Ivan Brkljaca	TKO	5 (6), 1:32	Apr 22, 2017	Sporthallen, Sundsvall, Sweden	
1	Win	1–0	(United States) Tracey Johnson	UD	4	Nov 26, 2016	(United States) Mohegan Sun Arena, Uncasville, Connecticut, U.S.	
