= Hassan Saada =

Moroccan boxer (born 1994)

Personal information
- Born: 2 January 1994 (age 32) Casablanca, Morocco
- Height: 1.83 m (6 ft 0 in)

Sport
- Sport: Boxing
- Club: Chaouia B
Medal record
Men's amateur boxing
Representing Morocco
African Championships
Bronze medal – third place	2015 Casablanca	Light heavyweight

Hassan Saada (born 2 January 1994) is a Moroccan boxer. Sadda won a bronze medal at the 2015 African Championships.

He was scheduled to compete in the men's light heavyweight competition at the 2016 Summer Olympics, but Saada was arrested the day before the opening ceremony over sexual assault charges. Allegations of sexual assault and attempted rape were made against him by two Brazilian women who worked in the Olympic Village in Barra da Tijuca as waitresses. Sadda remained in custody n Brazil for 10 months until an habeas corpus was granted by the Brazilian Supreme Court.
