= Dival Malonga =

Congolese boxer (born 1995)

Dival Forele Malonga Dzalamou (born April 18, 1995) is a boxer from the Republic of the Congo. He competed at the 2016 Summer Olympics in the men's light welterweight event, in which he was eliminated in the first round by Fazliddin Gaibnazarov.

Malonga won a bronze metal in the light welterweight event at the 2017 African Amateur Boxing Championships.
