= Judith Mbougnade =

Central African boxer (born 1998)

Judith Mbougnade (born July 11, 1998) is a boxer from the Central African Republic. She competed at the 2016 Summer Olympics in the women's flyweight event, in which she was eliminated in the round of 16 by Ingrit Valencia.
