= Mahaman Smaila =

Cameroonian boxer (born 1986)

Mahaman Smaila (born 28 February 1986) is an amateur boxer from Cameroon who competed in the 2008 Olympics at light welterweight but lost his first bout to Cuban Roniel Iglesias. In the 2016 Olympics, he lost his first bout to Batuhan Gözgeç of Turkey in the light welterweight class.
