= Fahem Hammachi =

Algerian boxer

Personal information
- Birth name: Faham Hammachi
- Nationality: Algerian

Sport
- Country: Algeria
- Event: Bantamweight

Fahem Hammachi is an Algerian boxer. He represented Algeria at the 2016 Summer Olympics in Rio de Janeiro Brazil. He was defeated in the round of 32 against Brazilian Boxer Robenílson de Jesus 1–2.
