= Rufat Huseynov =

Azerbaijani boxer (born 1997)

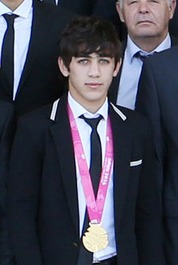

Personal information
- Born: 25 April 1997 (age 29) Ganja, Azerbaijan

Sport
- Sport: Boxing
Medal record
Men's amateur boxing
Representing Azerbaijan
Youth Olympic Games
Gold medal – first place	2014 Nanjing	49 kg

Rufat Huseynov (born 25 April 1997) is an Azerbaijani boxer. He competed in the men's light flyweight event at the 2016 Summer Olympics. He previously won the gold medal at the 2014 Summer Youth Olympics in the men's light flyweight.
