= Davilson Morais =

Cape Verdean boxer (born 1989)

Davilson Morais (born February 3, 1989) is a Cabo Verdean boxer. He competed at the 2016 Summer Olympics in the men's super heavyweight event, in which he was eliminated in the round of 16 by Joe Joyce.
