= Mathias Hamunyela =

Namibian boxer (born 1992)

Personal information
- Nationality: Namibian
- Born: 15 October 1992 (age 33) Eenhana, Namibia
- Height: 1.60 m (5 ft 3 in)

Boxing career
- Stance: Orthodox

Boxing record
- Total fights: 4
- Wins: 2
- Win by KO: 0
- Losses: 2
Medal record
Men's amateur boxing
Representing Namibia
African Games
Silver medal – second place	2015 Brazzaville	Light flyweight
African Championships
Gold medal – first place	2017 Brazzaville	Light flyweight

Mathias Tulyoongeleni Hamunyela (born 15 October 1992) is a Namibian professional boxer. As an amateur he competed in the men's light flyweight event at the 2016 Summer Olympics where he defeated Azerbaijan's Rufat Huseynov in the first round but lost to Kazakhstan's Birzhan Zhakypov in the second round.

== Professional boxing record ==
1 fight	1 win	0 losses
By decision	1	0

No.	Result	Record	Opponent	Type	Round, time	Date	Location	Notes
1	Win	1–0	(Namibia) Mathews Nghikevali	UD	4	6 Dec 2019	After school centre, Windhoek, Namibia	
