= Simplice Fotsala =

Cameroonian boxer (born 1989)

Personal information
- Born: 9 May 1989 (age 37) Yaoundé, Cameroon
- Height: 4 ft 7 in (140 cm)
- Weight: Bantamweight

Boxing career
- Stance: Orthodox

Boxing record
- Total fights: 3
- Wins: 2
- Win by KO: 1
- Losses: 1
Medal record
African Championships
Silver medal – second place	2017 Brazzaville	Light flyweight

Simplice Fotsala (born 9 May 1989) is a Cameroonian professional boxer. As an amateur, he competed in the men's light flyweight event at the 2016 Summer Olympics.

In April 2018, he was one of eight Cameroonian athletes who went missing from their accommodation during the 2018 Commonwealth Games in Australia.

== Professional boxing record ==
3 fights	2 wins	1 loss
By knockout	1	0
By decision	1	1

No.	Result	Record	Opponent	Type	Round, time	Date	Location	Notes
3	Win	2–1	(Indonesia) Johan Sigalingging	UD	4	15 Feb 2020	Grand Star Reception and Convention Centre, Altona North, Australia	
2	Win	1–1	(Australia) Amit Thapa	TKO	2 (4), 0:57	9 Nov 2019	Grand Star Reception and Convention Centre, Altona North, Australia	
1	Loss	0–1	(Australia) Sam Goodman	UD	6	29 Mar 2019	Fraternity Club, Fairy Meadow, Australia	
