= Tomasz Jabłoński =

Polish boxer (born 1988)

Personal information
- Born: 29 December 1988 (age 37) Gdynia, Poland

Sport
- Sport: Boxing
- Weight class: Middleweight
Medal record
Men's amateur boxing
Representing Poland
European Championships
Silver medal – second place	2015 Samokov	Middleweight

Tomasz Jabłoński (born 29 December 1988) is a Polish boxer. He competed in the men's middleweight event at the 2016 Summer Olympics.
