= Peter Mungai Warui =

Kenyan boxer (born 1981)

Personal information
- Born: 22 April 1981 (age 45)

Boxing career

Peter Mungai Warui (born 22 April 1981) is a Kenyan boxer. He competed in the men's light flyweight event at the 2016 Summer Olympics where he was eliminated in the quarterfinals.

== Career ==
Warui began boxing at the age of nine. As he could not afford gloves, he initially boxed bare-knuckled.

As an adult, Warui boxed for the Kenyan Police team while working as a police constable.

== Olympics ==
Warui finished in fourth place in the African qualifiers for the 2016 Summer Olympics. He qualified for the tournament finals after a Cameroonian boxer was disqualified.

In the round of 16, Warui defeated China's Lü Bin on a split decision. He attracted media attention for his flamboyant celebration after the win. In the quarter-finals, Warui was defeated by Cuban boxer Joahnys Argilagos.
