= Benny Muziyo =

Zambian boxer (born 1992)

Personal information
- Born: 8 November 1992 (age 33) Kafue, Zambia

Boxing career
Medal record
Men's amateur boxing
Representing Zambia
Commonwealth Games
Bronze medal – third place	2014 Glasgow	Middleweight
African Games
Bronze medal – third place	2015 Brazzaville	Middleweight

Benny Sichuundu Muziyo (born 8 November 1992) is a Zambian boxer. Muziyo won bronze in the men's middleweight event at the 2014 Commonwealth Games.

He competed in the men's middleweight event at the 2016 Summer Olympics. He secured his spot via an invitation from the Tripartite Commission. He lost a close split decision to Turkey's Önder Şipal after knocking down Şipal in the second round in his first Olympic bout.

In the 2018 Commonwealth Games he reached the quarter finals after scoring a knockout victory over Dominica's Roy Cooke in the round of 16. He was defeated 5-0 by eventual gold medalist Vikas Krishan Yadav of India in the quarter finals.
