= Reda Benbaziz =

Algerian boxer (born 1993)

Personal information
- Nationality: Algerian
- Born: 9 September 1993 (age 32) Béjaïa, Algeria

Sport
- Sport: Boxing
Medal record
Men's amateur boxing
Representing Algeria
African Championships
Gold medal – first place	2015 Casablanca	Lightweight
African Games
Gold medal – first place	2015 Brazzaville	Lightweight
Silver medal – second place	2011 Maputo	Bantamweight
Mediterranean Games
Gold medal – first place	2013 Mersin	Bantamweight
Bronze medal – third place	2018 Tarragona	Lightweight
Pan Arab Games
Bronze medal – third place	2011 Doha	Bantamweight

Reda Benbaziz (born 9 September 1993) is an Algerian boxer. He competed in the men's lightweight event at the 2016 Summer Olympics. He won gold medals in the African Championships and African Games in 2015 (lightweight division), as well as in the 2013 Mediterranean Games (bantamweight event). On December 2, 2022, Reda had his professional debut at the Centre 200 arena in Sydney, Nova Scotia Canada. He won by a second round knock out and was signed to a promotional agreement the following week by professional boxing promotional company Three Lions Promotions of Canada. According to Daniel Otter, managing director of the promotional outfit, Reda will be progress very well in the professional lightweight division.

== World Series of Boxing record ==
8 fights	5 wins	3 losses
By knockout	0	0
By decision	5	3

No.	Result	Record	Team	Opponent (Team)	Type	Round, time	Date	Location	Notes
8	Loss	5–3	Algeria Desert Hawks	Viktor Slavinskiy (Ukraine Otamans)	UD	5	10 April 2015	Kyiv, Ukraine	
7	Win	5–2	Algeria Desert Hawks	Lindolfo Delgado (Mexico Guerreros)	UD	5	21 March 2015	Blida, Algeria	
6	Win	4–2	Algeria Desert Hawks	(Russia) Adlan Abdurashidov (Russian Boxing Team)	UD	5	7 March 2015	Blida, Algeria	
5	Win	3–2	Algeria Desert Hawks	Hamza Rabii (Morocco Atlas Lions)	SD	5	20 February 2015	Casablanca, Morocco	
4	Win	2–2	Algeria Desert Hawks	(Bulgaria) Detelin Dalakliev (British Lionhearts)	UD	5	5 February 2015	(United Kingdom) London, Great Britain	
3	Loss	1–2	Algeria Desert Hawks	Lázaro Álvarez (Cuba Domadores)	UD	5	24 January 2015	Blida, Algeria	
2	Win	1–1	Algeria Desert Hawks	Brian Nunez (Argentina Condors)	UD	5	21 February 2014	Algiers, Algeria	
1	Loss	0–1	Algeria Desert Hawks	(Italy) Domenico Valentino (Italia Thunder)	UD	5	1 February 2014	Bergamo, Italy	WSB debut
