= Mahmoud Abdelaal =

Egyptian boxer (born 1992)

Personal information
- Born: 1 January 1992 (age 34) Cairo, Egypt

Boxing career
Medal record
Men's amateur boxing
Representing Egypt
African Championships
Silver medal – second place	2015 Casablanca	Lightweight

Mahmoud Abdelaal (born 1 January 1992) is an Egyptian boxer. He competed in the men's lightweight event at the 2016 Summer Olympics. He won the silver medal at the 2015 African Championships in the men's lightweight division.
