= Hassen Chaktami =

Tunisian boxer (born 1988)

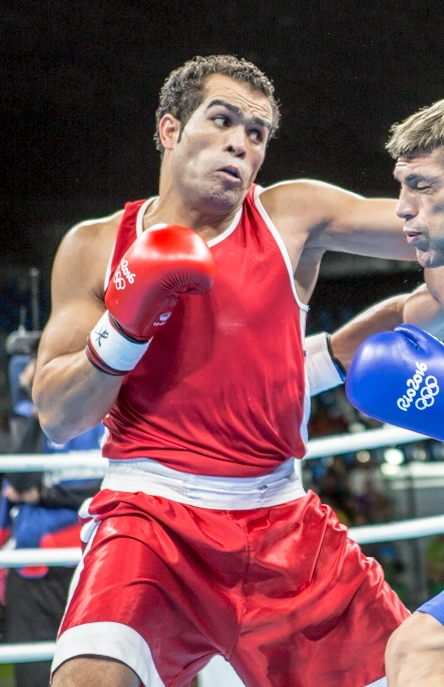
- Chaktami at the 2016 Olympics

Personal information
- Born: 14 December 1988 (age 37)
- Height: 180 cm (5 ft 11 in)

Sport
- Sport: Amateur boxing

Hassen Chaktami (born 14 December 1988) is a Tunisian heavyweight boxer. He competed at the 2016 Olympics, but was eliminated in the first bout.
