= Mohamed Hamout =

Moroccan boxer (born 1993)

Personal information
- Born: 11 December 1993 (age 32)
- Height: 167 cm (5 ft 6 in)
- Weight: 56 kg (123 lb)

Boxing career
Medal record
African Championships
Gold medal – first place	2015 Casablanca	Bantamweight
Mediterranean Games
Gold medal – first place	2022 Oran	Lightweight

Mohamed Hamout (born 11 December 1993) is a Moroccan boxer, who has represented his country in international competitions. He competed in the men's bantamweight event at the 2016 Summer Olympics, where he lost to Robeisy Ramirez of Cuba in the Round of 16. He also competed in the men's featherweight event at the 2020 Summer Olympics.
