= Hosam Bakr Abdin =

Egyptian boxer (born 1985)

Medal record

Representing Egypt

Men's Boxing

World Championships
Bronze medal – third place	2015 Doha	Middleweight

All-Africa Games
Bronze medal – third place	2007 Algiers	Welterweight

African Championships
Gold medal – first place	2015 Casablanca	Middleweight
Silver medal – second place	2017 Brazzaville	Middleweight

Mediterranean Games
Silver medal – second place	2013 Mersin	Middleweight

Pan Arab Games
Silver medal – second place	2011 Doha	Welterweight

Hossam Hussein Bakr Abdin (born October 26, 1985) is an Egyptian boxer who won a welterweight bronze at the 2007 All-Africa Games and later qualified for the 2008 Summer Olympics. He also won gold in his weight division at the African Championships in 2015 and then silver in 2017, qualifying for the 2016 Summer Olympics.

== Career ==
At the Arab Championships, he lost to Tunisian Rached Merdassi but won the Arab Games later that year. At the All-Africa Games he was knocked out in the semifinal by Ghanaian Bastir Samir and won bronze. He also participated at the 2007 World Championships. At the Olympic qualifier, he defeated Choaib Oussaci of Algeria 16–6. In his first Olympic match he defeated Non Boonjumnong of Thailand 11–10, in the quarter final he lost to Cuban Carlos Banteux.
