= Bilel Mhamdi =

Tunisian boxer (born 1992)

Personal information
- Nationality: Tunisian
- Born: 27 January 1992 (age 34) Tunisia

Boxing career
Medal record
African Championships
Silver medal – second place	2015 Casablanca	Bantamweight
Bronze medal – third place	2017 Brazzaville	Bantamweight
African Games
Gold medal – first place	2015 Brazzaville	Bantamweight
Mediterranean Games
Bronze medal – third place	2018 Tarragona	Bantamweight
Bronze medal – third place	2022 Oran	Featherweight

Bilel Mhamdi (born 27 January 1992) is a Tunisian boxer. He competed in the men's bantamweight event at the 2016 Summer Olympics. Mhamdi won a bronze medal in the bantamweight division at the 2018 Mediterranean Games.
