= Walid Sedik Mohamed =

Egyptian boxer (born 1993)

Medal record

Representing Egypt

Men's Boxing

African Championships
Silver medal – second place	2015 Casablanca	Welterweight
Bronze medal – third place	2017 Brazzaville	Welterweight

Walid Sedik Mohamed (born August 22, 1993) is an Egyptian boxer. He competed at the 2016 Summer Olympics in the men's welterweight event, in which he was eliminated in the round of 32 by Josh Kelly of Great Britain.
