= Moroke Mokhotho =

Lesotho boxer (born 1990)

Personal information
- Nationality: Mosotho
- Born: 12 November 1990 (age 35)

Boxing career

Moroke Mokhotho (born 12 November 1990) is a Mosotho boxer. He competed in the men's flyweight event at the 2016 Summer Olympics where he lost in the first round. In March 2022, Mokhotho opened his own sports academy in Ha-Thetsane, Maseru.
