= Marlo Delgado =

Ecuadorian boxer (born 1993)

Marlo Javier Delgado Suarez (born May 6, 1993) is an Ecuadorian professional boxer. As an amateur he competed at the 2012 Summer Olympics in the Men's middleweight, but was defeated in the first round.

== Professional boxing record ==
3 fights	3 wins	0 losses
By knockout	1	0
By decision	2	0

No.	Result	Record	Opponent	Type	Round, time	Date	Location	Notes
3	Win	3–0	(Ecuador) Antonio Ocles	UD	8	9 Nov 2019	Gimnasio HIIT, Quito, Ecuador	
2	Win	2–0	(Colombia) Dionisio Miranda	KO	1 (8), 1:03	19 Jul 2019	Coliseo Julio Cesar Hidalgo, Quito, Ecuador	
1	Win	1–0	(Mexico) Orlando Vazquez	UD	8	13 Apr 2019	Coliseo del Colegio Maria Eufrasia, Quito, Ecuador	
