= Anauel Ngamissengue =

Congolese boxer (born 1996)

Personal information
- Born: Mpi Anauel Ngamissengue; 3 February 1996 (age 30) Brazzaville, Republic of the Congo
- Height: 5 ft 9.5 in (177 cm)
- Weight: Middleweight; Super middleweight

Boxing career
- Stance: Orthodox

Boxing record
- Total fights: 15
- Wins: 14
- Win by KO: 9
- Losses: 1

Mpi Anauel Ngamissengue (born 3 February 1996) is a Congolese-French professional boxer. As an amateur, he competed at the 2016 Summer Olympics in the men's middleweight event, in which he was eliminated by Ilyas Abbadi in the round of 32.

== Professional boxing record ==
16 fights	15 wins	1 loss
By knockout	10	1
By decision	5	0

No.	Result	Record	Opponent	Type	Round, time	Date	Location	Notes
16	Win	15–1	Jose Rivas	KO	2 (8)	10 Oct 2025	Palais des Sports, Marseille, France	
15	Loss	14–1	Janibek Alimkhanuly	TKO	5 (12), 2:59	5 Apr 2025	Barys Arena, Astana, Kazakhstan	For WBO and IBF middleweight titles
14	Win	14–0	Sandro Jajanidze	TKO	3 (6)	Jun 8, 2024	Complexe Sportif Alain Mallon, Neuilly-en-Thelle, France	
13	Win	13–0	Fiodor Czerkaszyn	MD	8	Aug 26, 2023	Stadion Wrocław, Wrocław, Poland	
12	Win	12–0	Matteo Hache	TKO	7 (10)	Nov 25, 2022	Zenith Metropole, Nantes, France	
11	Win	11–0	Martin Owono	TKO	4 (6)	Jun 4, 2022	Complexe Sportif Alain Mallon, Neuilly-en-Thelle, France	
10	Win	10–0	Jean Nestor Nkoulou Mama	TKO	2 (4)	Dec 18, 2021	Palais des Sports, Marseille, France	
9	Win	9–0	Kassimou Mouhamadou	TKO	4 (8)	Dec 18, 2021	Gymnase de la Fighting Academie, Villers-sur-Mer, France	
8	Win	8–0	Pedrag Cvetkovic	TKO	1 (6)	Sept 18, 2021	Casino Tranchant, Villers-sur-Mer, France	
7	Win	7–0	Kassimou Mouhamadou	UD	6	Jul 3, 2021	Salle du Haut Dick, Carentan, Manche, France	
6	Win	6–0	Kevin Bertogal	UD	6	Oct 10, 2020	Chateau des Rochers, Nogent-sur-Oise, Oise, France	
5	Win	5–0	Kevin Bertogal	UD	6	July 30, 2020	Cirque Bormann, Paris, France	
4	Win	4–0	Ismael Seck	UD	6	28 Feb 2020	Palais des Sports, Agde, France	
3	Win	3–0	Davit Makaradze	TKO	4 (6)	25 Jan 2020	Palais des Sports, Orléans, France	
2	Win	2–0	Kamel Benyattou	KO	1 (6)	28 Dec 2019	Salle Florence Artaud, Lille, France	
1	Win	1–0	Sladjan Dragisic	TKO	2 (4)	19 Oct 2019	Salle du Lièvre d’Or, Châteauneuf-sur-Loire, France	
