= African Amateur Boxing Championships =

Boxing competitions

African Boxing Championships
- Status: Active
- Genre: Sports event
- Date: Midyear
- Frequency: Annual
- Inaugurated: 1962 / 2001
- Organiser: AFBC

The African Amateur Boxing Championships is the premier pan-continental annual competition for amateur boxing in Africa. The championships are organised by the continent's governing body, the African Boxing Union (ABU). The first edition of the tournament took place in 1962.

== Editions ==
From 2017, it was held Men and Women in same country and same time.

=== Men's editions ===
Number	Year	Host	Dates	Events	Nations	Boxers	Champion
1	1962	Cairo, Egypt	17–23 March	10			Egypt
2	1964	Accra, Ghana	... April–... May	10	8		United Arab Republic
3	1966	Lagos, Nigeria	26–30 April	10	14		Ghana
4	1968	Lusaka, Zambia	6–11 May	11	16		United Arab Republic
5	1972	Nairobi, Kenya	28 February–4 March	11			Uganda
6	1974	Kampala, Uganda	9–14 December	11			Uganda
7	1979	Benghazi, Libya	12–21 July	11			Kenya
8	1983	Kampala, Uganda	17–25 August	11			Zambia
9	1994	Johannesburg, South Africa	...–... December	12			South Africa
10	1998	Algiers, Algeria	7–17 May	12	15	220	Algeria
11	2001	Port Louis, Mauritius	14–20 May	12			Algeria
12	2003	Yaoundé, Cameroon	9–18 May	11	14	90	Algeria
14	2005	Casablanca, Morocco	29 April–8 May	11			Tunisia
15	2007	Antananarivo, Madagascar	21–27 May	11			Algeria
16	2009	Vacoas, Mauritius	21–26 July	11			Morocco
17	2011	Yaoundé, Cameroon	3–10 June	10			Algeria
18	2015	Casablanca, Morocco	17–24 August	10	19	103	Morocco

=== Women's editions ===
Number	Year	Host	Dates	Events	Nations	Boxers	Champion
1	2001	Cairo, Egypt	5–9 July	11			Egypt
2	2010	Yaoundé, Cameroon	23–28 March	7			Cameroon
3	2014	Yaoundé, Cameroon	3–7 March	5			Morocco

=== Combined editions ===
Number	Year	Host	Dates	Events	Nations	Boxers	Champion		
Number	Year	Host	Dates	Events	Nations	Boxers	Men	Women	Total
19	2017	(Republic of the Congo) Brazzaville, Congo	18–25 June	18	24	183	Cameroon	Cameroon	Cameroon
20	2022	Maputo, Mozambique	12–17 September	24	24	211	Mozambique	Algeria	Algeria
21	2023	Yaoundé, Cameroon	28 July –6 August	25	27	264	Morocco	Morocco	Morocco
22	2024	(Democratic Republic of the Congo) Kinshasa, DR Congo	18 October –27 October	25	-	-	Morocco	Morocco	Morocco

== All-time medal table ==
=== Men ===
As of 2015 including men's events of the combined editions until 2024:

Rank	Nation	Gold	Silver	Bronze	Total
1	Algeria	37	23	22	82
2	Morocco	27	23	25	75
3	Kenya	21	15	12	48
4	Egypt	20	17	13	50
5	Uganda	18	16	15	49
6	Cameroon	18	15	13	46
7	Ghana	16	17	15	48
8	Mauritius	13	11	9	33
9	DR Congo	11	6	10	27
10	Tunisia	10	3	18	31
11	South Africa	8	10	21	39
12	Zambia	8	5	6	19
13	Nigeria	7	16	10	33
14	Namibia	4	2	3	9
15	Mozambique	3	3	4	10
16	Senegal	2	6	12	20
17	Gabon	2	6	8	16
18	Madagascar	2	2	4	8
19	Libya	2	2	0	4
20	Niger	2	1	0	3
21	Botswana	1	9	19	29
22	Sudan	1	4	3	8
23	Congo	1	2	7	10
24	Benin	1	0	6	7
25	Tanzania	0	5	1	6
26	Burkina Faso	0	3	4	7
26	Guinea	0	3	4	7
28	Seychelles	0	2	2	4
29	Mali	0	1	6	7
30	Togo	0	1	4	5
31	Angola	0	1	3	4
32	Ivory Coast	0	1	2	3
33	Burundi	0	1	0	1
33	Zimbabwe	0	1	0	1
35	Cape Verde	0	0	2	2
35	Ethiopia	0	0	2	2
35	Rwanda	0	0	2	2
38	Lesotho	0	0	1	1
Totals (38 entries)		235	233	288	756

Need bronze medals of 1983 and 1994 editions

=== Women ===
As of 2014 inclueding women's events of the combined editions until 2024:

Rank	Nation	Gold	Silver	Bronze	Total
1	Morocco	15	15	5	35
2	Algeria	10	10	4	24
3	DR Congo	9	8	13	30
4	Egypt	8	8	0	16
5	Cameroon	8	6	11	25
6	Mozambique	4	0	4	8
7	Tunisia	2	3	3	8
8	Nigeria	2	1	2	5
8	Uganda	2	1	2	5
10	Zambia	2	0	2	4
11	Botswana	1	1	4	6
12	Cape Verde	1	1	0	2
13	Congo	1	0	2	3
14	Sierra Leone	1	0	0	1
15	Kenya	0	2	6	8
16	Senegal	0	1	5	6
17	Niger	0	1	1	2
17	Tanzania	0	1	1	2
19	Burkina Faso	0	1	0	1
19	Central African Republic	0	1	0	1
21	South Africa	0	0	9	9
22	Madagascar	0	0	2	2
23	Angola	0	0	1	1
23	Burundi	0	0	1	1
23	Ethiopia	0	0	1	1
23	Libya	0	0	1	1
23	Seychelles	0	0	1	1
Totals (27 entries)		66	61	81	208

Need bronze medals of 2001 and 2010 (with some silver medals) editions

== See also ==
- Boxing at the African Games
- World Amateur Boxing Championships

== Results database ==
- http://amateur-boxing.strefa.pl/Championships/AAAChampionships.html
