= 2011 World Amateur Boxing Championships – Light welterweight =

Boxing competitions

The Light welterweight competition was the fifth lightest class featured at the 2011 World Amateur Boxing Championships, held at the Heydar Aliyev Sports and Exhibition Complex. Boxers were limited to a maximum of 64 kilograms (141 lb) in body mass.

== Medalists ==
Gold	Éverton Lopes (BRA)
Silver	Denys Berinchyk (UKR)
Bronze	Tom Stalker (ENG)
Bronze	Vincenzo Mangiacapre (ITA)

== Seeds ==
1. (Cuba) Roniel Solotongo (first round)
2. (Mongolia) Uranchimegiin Mönkh-Erdene (quarterfinals)
3. (Hungary) Gyula Káté (quarterfinals)
4. (Republic of Ireland) Ray Moylette (second round)
5. (England) Tom Stalker (semifinals)
6. (Brazil) Éverton Lopes (champion)
7. (Mexico) Juan Romero (second round)
8. (Azerbaijan) Heybatulla Hajialiyev (quarterfinals)
9. (Turkey) Onur Şipal (second round)

== Draw ==
=== Finals ===
Semifinals
1	Denys Berinchyk (UKR)	31
4	Tom Stalker (ENG)	18
3	Éverton Lopes (BRA)	16
2	Vincenzo Mangiacapre (ITA)	7

Final
Denys Berinchyk (UKR)	23
Éverton Lopes (BRA)	26

=== Round of 128 ===
Round of 128
	Score	
Naziri Piraki (TJK)	RSC	Denys Berinchyk (UKR)
Yauheni Ramashkevich (BLR)	RSC	Mohammed Abdulla (QAT)
Babou Smaila (CMR)	18–15	Xhuljo Vrenozi (ALB)

=== Top half ===
==== Section 1 ====
First round
Roniel Solotongo (CUB)	19
Denys Berinchyk (UKR)	+19
Anderso Rojas (ECU)	19
Jean Bikorimana (RWA)	7
Jonathan Alonso (ESP)	17
Stylianos Papadopoulos (GRE)	8
Angel Hristov (BUL)	17
Khawaja Ayoubi (AFG)	11
Onur Şipal (TUR)	16
Luis Amador (NCA)	5
Ričardas Kuncaitis (LTU)	17
Sanjarbek Rahmonov (UZB)	21
Koba Pkhakadze (GEO)	29
Michael Amoo Bediako (GHA)	5
Eslam Aly (EGY)	7
Heybatulla Hajialiyev (AZE)	15

Second round
Denys Berinchyk (UKR)	26
Anderso Rojas (ECU)	13
Jonathan Alonso (ESP)	16
Angel Hristov (BUL)	14
Onur Şipal (TUR)	22
Sanjarbek Rahmonov (UZB)	23
Koba Pkhakadze (GEO)	15
Heybatulla Hajialiyev (AZE)	18

Third round
Denys Berinchyk (UKR)	27
Jonathan Alonso (ESP)	10
Sanjarbek Rahmonov (UZB)	22
Heybatulla Hajialiyev (AZE)	33

Quarterfinals
Denys Berinchyk (UKR)	33
Heybatulla Hajialiyev (AZE)	19

==== Section 2 ====
First round
Tom Stalker (ENG)	17
Yoelvis Hernández (VEN)	10
Romaric Bassole (BUR)	22
Nathan Ridings (ESA)	11
Daniel Badulescu (ROU)	6
Serda Hudayberdiyyev (TKM)	7
Alexander Solyanikov (RUS)	13
Ermex Sakenov (KGZ)	9
Hu Qing (CHN)	20
Jamel Herring (USA)	5
Samir Machrouh (FRA)	RSC
Jaber Alfafi (KSA)
Valentino Knowles (BAH)	11
Manoj Kumar (IND)	17
Arturs Ahmetovs (LAT)	11
Ray Moylette (IRL)	16

Second round
Tom Stalker (ENG)	13
Romaric Bassole (BUR)	2
Serda Hudayberdiyyev (TKM)	6
Alexander Solyanikov (RUS)	17
Hu Qing (CHN)	18
Samir Machrouh (FRA)	15
Manoj Kumar (IND)	19
Ray Moylette (IRL)	7

Third round
Tom Stalker (ENG)	17
Alexander Solyanikov (RUS)	9
Hu Qing (CHN)	15
Manoj Kumar (IND)	17

Quarterfinals
Tom Stalker (ENG)	24
Manoj Kumar (IND)	18

=== Bottom half ===
==== Section 3 ====
First round
Gyula Káté (HUN)	24
Yauheni Ramashkevich (BLR)	14
Ljubomir Marjanović (SRB)	14
Yves Ulysse Jr. (CAN)	20
Masatsugu Kawachi (JPN)	17
Chris Jenkins (WAL)	13
Daniyar Yeleussinov (KAZ)	11
Josh Taylor (SCO)	5
Tulani Mbenge (RSA)	8
Mohamed El Machhabi (MAR)	14
Park Sang (KOR)	11
Anthony Yigit (SWE)	29
Elias Ortega (BOL)	5
Jeff Horn (AUS)	42
Michał Syrowatka (POL)
Éverton Lopes (BRA)	RSC

Second round
Gyula Káté (HUN)	27
Yves Ulysse Jr. (CAN)	17
Masatsugu Kawachi (JPN)	4
Daniyar Yeleussinov (KAZ)	14
Mohamed El Machhabi (MAR)	10
Anthony Yigit (SWE)	18
Jeff Horn (AUS)	10
Éverton Lopes (BRA)	22

Third round
Gyula Káté (HUN)	17
Daniyar Yeleussinov (KAZ)	11
Anthony Yigit (SWE)	10
Éverton Lopes (BRA)	22

Quarterfinals
Gyula Káté (HUN)	RET
Éverton Lopes (BRA)

==== Section 4 ====
First round
Juan Romero (MEX)	18
Violin Berzoi (MDA)	12
Vincenzo Mangiacapre (ITA)	20
Sisira Ruwangala (SRI)	3
Zdeněk Chládek (CZE)	17
Wuttichai Masuk (THA)	11
David Müller (GER)	11
Hrachik Javakhyan (ARM)	17
Afdan Bachtila (INA)	9
Amir Khan (PAK)	13
Mehdi Tolouti (IRI)	24
Rolando Tacuyan (PHI)	16
Lyndel Marcellin (LCA)	20
Adamou Mounkaïla (NIG)	15
Babou Smaila (CMR)	10
Uranchimegiin Mönkh-Erdene (MGL)	20

Second round
Juan Romero (MEX)	14
Vincenzo Mangiacapre (ITA)	24
Zdeněk Chládek (CZE)	10
Hrachik Javakhyan (ARM)	6
Amir Khan (PAK)	17
Mehdi Tolouti (IRI)	28
Lyndel Marcellin (LCA)	6
Uranchimegiin Mönkh-Erdene (MGL)	20

Third round
Vincenzo Mangiacapre (ITA)	16
Zdeněk Chládek (CZE)	9
Mehdi Tolouti (IRI)	9
Uranchimegiin Mönkh-Erdene (MGL)	24

Quarterfinals
Vincenzo Mangiacapre (ITA)	16
Uranchimegiin Mönkh-Erdene (MGL)	11
