= 2013 AIBA World Boxing Championships – Light welterweight =

Boxing competitions

The Light welterweight competition at the 2013 AIBA World Boxing Championships was held from 15–26 October 2013. Boxers were limited to a weight of 64 kilograms.

== Medalists ==
Gold	Merey Akshalov (KAZ)
Silver	Yasniel Toledo (CUB)
Bronze	Éverton Lopes (BRA)
Bronze	Uranchimegiin Mönkh-Erdene (MGL)

== Seeds ==
1. (Brazil) Éverton Lopes (semifinals)
2. (Mongolia) Uranchimegiin Mönkh-Erdene (semifinals)
3. (Russia) Armen Zakaryan (third round)
4. (Serbia) Branimir Stanković (second round)
5. (Kazakhstan) Merey Akshalov (champion)
6. (India) Manoj Kumar (quarterfinals)
7. (Algeria) Abdelkader Chadi (third round)
8. (Lithuania) Evaldas Petrauskas (quarterfinals)
9. (Moldova) Dmitrijs Galagot (third round)
10. (Azerbaijan) Heybatulla Hajialiyev (second round)

== Draw ==
=== Finals ===
Semifinals
1	(Brazil) Éverton Lopes	1
4	(Kazakhstan) Merey Akshalov	2
3	(Cuba) Yasniel Toledo	3
2	(Mongolia) Uranchimegiin Mönkh-Erdene	0

Final
(Kazakhstan) Merey Akshalov	3
(Cuba) Yasniel Toledo	0

=== Top half ===
==== Section 1 ====
First Round
(Mauritius) Richarno Colin	2
(Norway) Salavat Khatuev	1
(France) Abdel-Malik Ladjali	3
(Japan) Kazuki Saito	0
(Germany) Artem Harutyunyan	2
(Sweden) Clarence Bojang	1
(Australia) David Biddle	TKO
(Nepal) Deepak Shrestha
(Latvia) Artūrs Ahmetovs	0
(Thailand) Wuttichai Masuk	3

Second Round
(Brazil) Éverton Lopes	3
(Mauritius) Richarno Colin	0
(France) Abdel-Malik Ladjali	0
(Germany) Artem Harutyunyan	3
(Moldova) Dmitrijs Galagot	3
(Australia) David Biddle	0
(Thailand) Wuttichai Masuk	0
(Lithuania) Evaldas Petrauskas	3

Third Round
(Brazil) Éverton Lopes	2
(Germany) Artem Harutyunyan	1
(Moldova) Dmitrijs Galagot	1
(Lithuania) Evaldas Petrauskas	2

Quarterfinals
(Brazil) Éverton Lopes	2
(Lithuania) Evaldas Petrauskas	1

==== Section 2 ====
First Round
(Scotland) Josh Taylor	3
(Trinidad and Tobago) Akiel Outram	0
(Dominican Republic) Carlos Adames	TKO
(Eswatini) Sibonelo Ndzimandze
(United States) Jose Alday, Jr.	3
(Guinea) Mamadou Keita	0
(Republic of Ireland) Ray Moylette	2
(Greece) Alexandros Tsanikidis	1
(Wales) Zack Davies	0
(Kyrgyzstan) Ermek Sakenov	3
(Tajikistan) Shavkatdzhon Rakhimov	2
(Angola) Adilson Justino	1

Second Round
(Kazakhstan) Merey Akshalov	3
(Scotland) Josh Taylor	0
(Dominican Republic) Carlos Adames	3
(United States) Jose Alday, Jr.	0
(Republic of Ireland) Ray Moylette	0
(Kyrgyzstan) Ermek Sakenov	3
(Tajikistan) Shavkatdzhon Rakhimov	2
(Serbia) Branimir Stanković	1

Third Round
(Kazakhstan) Merey Akshalov	3
(Dominican Republic) Carlos Adames	0
(Kyrgyzstan) Ermek Sakenov	3
(Tajikistan) Shavkatdzhon Rakhimov	0

Quarterfinals
(Kazakhstan) Merey Akshalov	3
(Kyrgyzstan) Ermek Sakenov	0

=== Bottom half ===
==== Section 3 ====
First Round
(Hungary) András Vadász	3
(Cayman Islands) Kendall Ebanks	0
(England) Samuel Maxwell	DQ
(Italy) Dario Vangeli
(Cuba) Yasniel Toledo	TKO
(Palestine) Mohammedalaa Menaw
(Egypt) Mohamed Eslam	0
(Canada) Yves Ulysse Jr.	3
(Czech Republic) Zdeněk Chládek	0
(Mexico) Juan Romero	3
(Kenya) Denis Okoth	1
(Turkey) Fatih Keleş	2

Second Round
(Russia) Armen Zakaryan	3
(Hungary) András Vadász	0
(Italy) Dario Vangeli
(Cuba) Yasniel Toledo	WO
(Canada) Yves Ulysse Jr.	3
(Mexico) Juan Romero	0
(Turkey) Fatih Keleş	1
(India) Manoj Kumar	2

Third Round
(Russia) Armen Zakaryan	0
(Cuba) Yasniel Toledo	3
(Canada) Yves Ulysse Jr.	1
(India) Manoj Kumar	2

Quarterfinals
(Cuba) Yasniel Toledo	3
(India) Manoj Kumar	0

==== Section 4 ====
First Round
(Armenia) Artur Kirajyan	1
(Belarus) Yauheni Dauhaliavets	2
(Zambia) Gilbert Choombe	0
(Uzbekistan) Sanjarbek Rakhmanov	3
(Philippines) Dennis Galvan	0
(Azerbaijan) Heybatulla Hajialiyev	3
(Bulgaria) Ayrin Ismetov	2
(Venezuela) Johan Méndez	1
(Ukraine) Vyacheslav Kyslytsyn
(Israel) Igor Lazarev	TKO
(China) Tuolewuta Sairike	1
(Turkmenistan) Aziz Bebitov	2

Second Round
(Algeria) Abdelkader Chadi	3
(Belarus) Yauheni Dauhaliavets	0
(Uzbekistan) Sanjarbek Rakhmanov	3
(Azerbaijan) Heybatulla Hajialiyev	0
(Bulgaria) Ayrin Ismetov	3
(Israel) Igor Lazarev	0
(Turkmenistan) Aziz Bebitov	0
(Mongolia) Uranchimegiin Mönkh-Erdene	3

Third Round
(Algeria) Abdelkader Chadi	1
(Uzbekistan) Sanjarbek Rakhmanov	2
(Bulgaria) Ayrin Ismetov	0
(Mongolia) Uranchimegiin Mönkh-Erdene	3

Quarterfinals
(Uzbekistan) Sanjarbek Rakhmanov	1
(Mongolia) Uranchimegiin Mönkh-Erdene	2
