= Boxing at the 2012 Summer Olympics – Men's light welterweight =

Boxing competitions

Men's light welterweight boxing at the Games of the XXX Olympiad
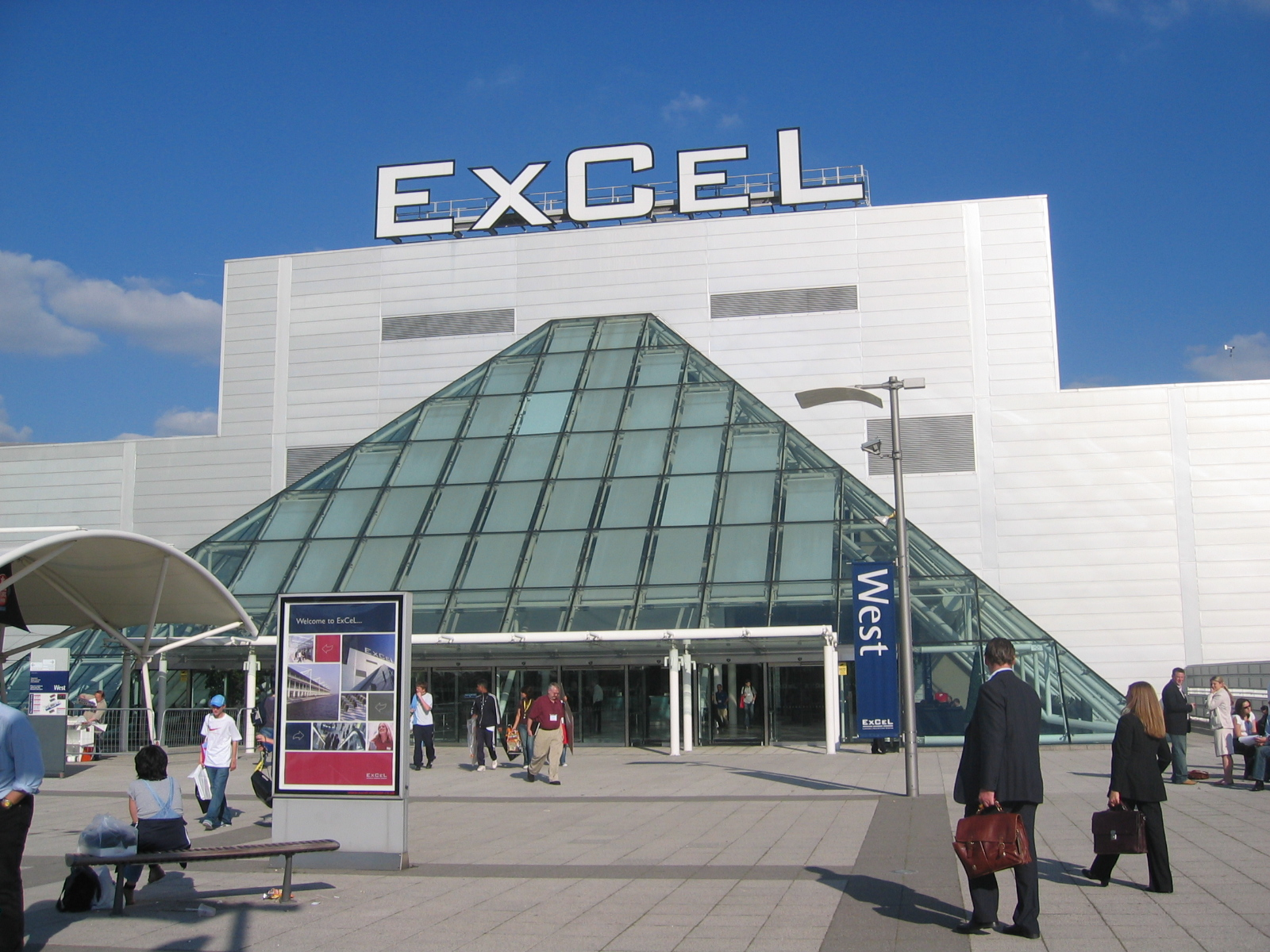
- ExCel Exhibition Centre
- Venue: ExCeL Exhibition Centre
- Date: 31 July to 11 August 2012
- Competitors: 28 from 28 nations

Medalists
1st place, gold medalist(s)		Roniel Iglesias; Cuba
2nd place, silver medalist(s)		Denys Berinchyk; Ukraine
3rd place, bronze medalist(s)		Vincenzo Mangiacapre; Italy
3rd place, bronze medalist(s)		Uranchimegiin Mönkh-Erdene; Mongolia

The men's light welterweight boxing competition at the 2012 Olympic Games in London was held from 31 July to 11 August at the ExCeL Exhibition Centre.

Twenty-eight boxers from 28 nations competed.

== Competition format ==
The competition consisted of a single-elimination tournament. Bronze medals were awarded to both semi-final losers. Bouts were three rounds of three minutes each.

== Schedule ==
All times are British Summer Time (UTC+1)

Date	Time	Round
Tuesday 31 July 2012	14:45 & 21:45	Round of 32
Saturday 4 August 2012	14:30 & 21:30	Round of 16
Wednesday 8 August 2012	21:30	Quarter-finals
Friday 10 August 2012	14:30	Semi-finals
Saturday 11 August 2012	21:15	Final

== Results ==
=== Finals ===
Semi-finals
Roniel Iglesias (CUB)	15
Vincenzo Mangiacapre (ITA)	8
Uranchimegiin Mönkh-Erdene (MGL)	21
Denys Berinchyk (UKR)	29

Final
Roniel Iglesias (CUB)	22
Denys Berinchyk (UKR)	15

=== Top half ===
Round of 32
Roniel Iglesias (CUB)	20
César Villarraga (COL)	9
Anderson Rojas (ECU)	10
Uktamjon Rahmonov (UZB)	16
Serge Ambomo (CMR)	10
Yakup Şener (TUR)	19
Jamel Herring (USA)	9
Daniyar Yeleussinov (KAZ)	19
Jonathan Alonso (ESP)	12
Mehdi Tolouti (IRI)	16
Gyula Káté (HUN)	16
Eslam Mohamed (EGY)	10

Round of 16
Éverton Lopes (BRA)	15
Roniel Iglesias (CUB)	18
Uktamjon Rahmonov (UZB)	16
Yakup Şener (TUR)	8
Daniyar Yeleussinov (KAZ)	19
Mehdi Tolouti (IRI)	10
Gyula Káté (HUN)	14
Vincenzo Mangiacapre (ITA)	20

Quarter-finals
Roniel Iglesias (CUB)	21
Uktamjon Rahmonov (UZB)	15
Daniyar Yeleussinov (KAZ)	12
Vincenzo Mangiacapre (ITA)	16

Semi-finals
Roniel Iglesias (CUB)	15
Vincenzo Mangiacapre (ITA)	8

=== Bottom half ===
Round of 32
Serdar Hudayberdiyev (TKM)	7
Manoj Kumar (IND)	13
Abdelhak Aatakni (MAR)	10
Richarno Colin (MRI)	16
Zdeněk Chládek (CZE)	12
Uranchimegiin Mönkh-Erdene (MGL)	20
Jeff Horn (AUS)	19
Gilbert Choombe (ZAM)	5
Abderrazak Houya (TUN)	19
Heybatulla Hajialiyev (AZE)	16
Anthony Yigit (SWE)	13
Francisco Vargas (PUR)	9

Round of 16
Tom Stalker (GBR)	20
Manoj Kumar (IND)	16
Richarno Colin (MRI)	12
Uranchimegiin Mönkh-Erdene (MGL)	15
Jeff Horn (AUS)	17
Abderrazak Houya (TUN)	11
Anthony Yigit (SWE)	23
Denys Berinchyk (UKR)	24

Quarter-finals
Tom Stalker (GBR)	22
Uranchimegiin Mönkh-Erdene (MGL)	23
Jeff Horn (AUS)	13
Denys Berinchyk (UKR)	21

Semi-finals
Uranchimegiin Mönkh-Erdene (MGL)	21
Denys Berinchyk (UKR)	29
