= Elorde =

Elorde is the surname of the following people:

- Gabriel Elorde (1935–1985), Filipino boxer
- Juan Martin Elorde (born 1984), Filipino boxer, grandson of Gabriel
- Juan Miguel Elorde (born 1986), Filipino boxer, grandson of Gabriel, brother of Juan Martin
- Nico Elorde, Filipino basketball player, grandson of Gabriel, brother of Juan Miguel and Juan Martin
- Gabriel "Bebot" Elorde Jr, (born 1957), Filipino Boxing Promoter / Manager, son of the late Gabriel "Flash" Elorde
