= Denys Berinchyk =

Ukrainian boxer (born 1988)

Denys Berinchyk Денис Берiнчик
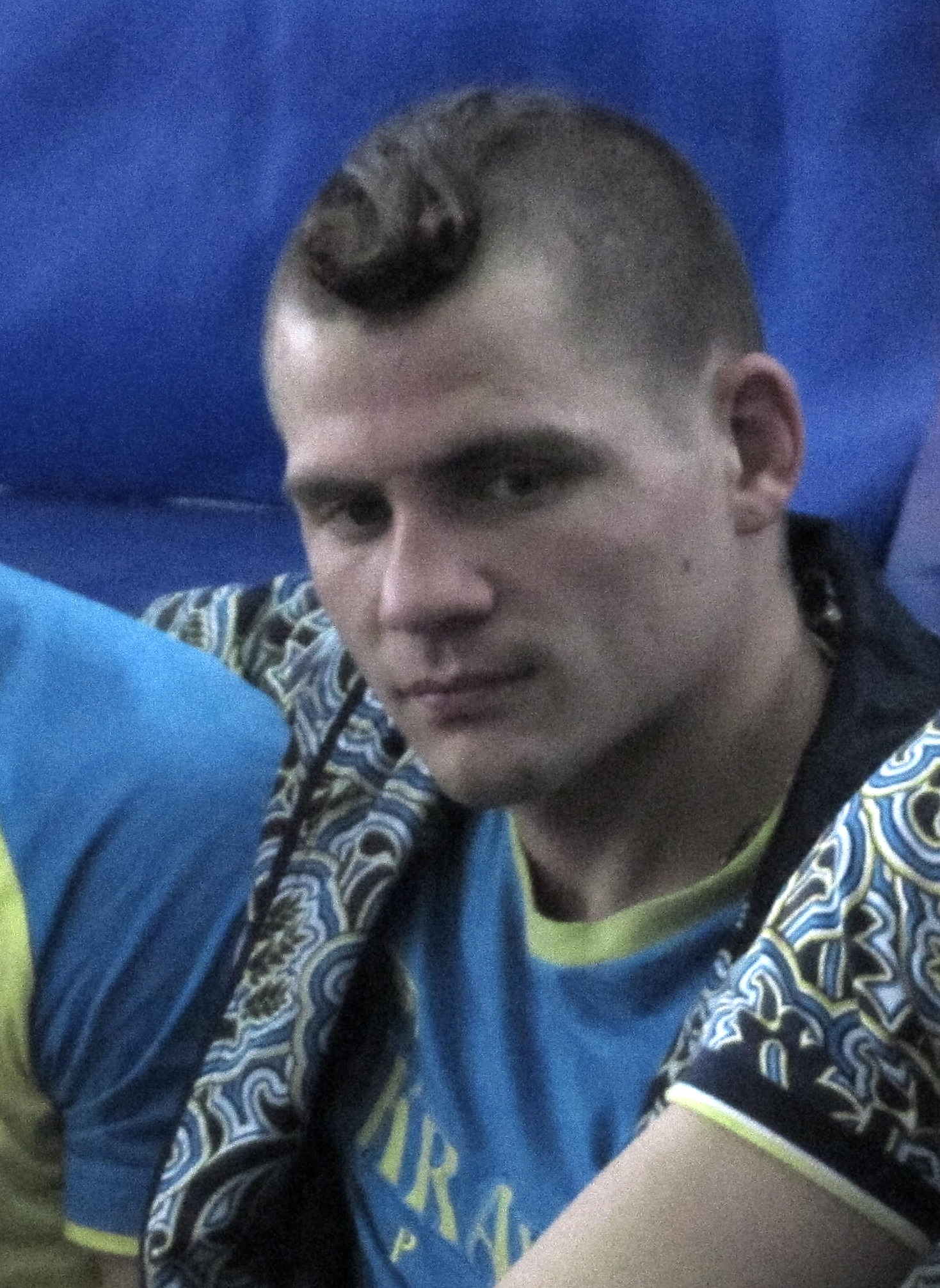
- Berinchyk in 2012

Personal information
- Nationality: Ukrainian
- Born: Denys Yuriyovych Berinchyk; 5 May 1988 (age 38) Krasnodon, Ukrainian SSR, USSR (now Ukraine)
- Height: 5 ft 7 in (170 cm)
- Weight: Lightweight

Boxing career
- Stance: Orthodox

Boxing record
- Total fights: 21
- Wins: 19
- Win by KO: 9
- Losses: 2
Medal record
Men's Amateur boxing
Representing Ukraine
Olympic Games
Silver medal – second place	2012 London	Light welterweight
World Championships
Silver medal – second place	2011 Baku	Light welterweight
Summer Universiade
Bronze medal – third place	2013 Kazan	Light welterweight
World University Championships
Gold medal – first place	2010 Ulaanbaatar	Light welterweight

Denys Berinchyk (Ukrainian: Денис Берінчик, pronounced [deˈnɪz beˈr⁽ʲ⁾intʃɪk]; born 5 May 1988) is a Ukrainian professional boxer. He previously held the World Boxing Organization (WBO) lightweight title from 2024 to 2025.

As an amateur, he won silver medals in the light-welterweight division at the 2011 World Championships and the 2012 Summer Olympics. He made his professional bare knuckle debut on 24 July 2021, defeating former UFC Fighter Artem Lobov by TKO.

He has a PhD in physical education and sport, obtained at the National University of Ukraine on Physical Education and Sport.

== Amateur boxing career ==
=== 2011 World Amateur Boxing Championships ===
In the 2011 World Championships, he beat the No.1 seeded and reigning champion Cuban Roniel Iglesias Solotongo on points. In the gold medal bout, he was beaten by Everton Lopes of Brazil following the encounter ended 26–23. Finished the championship as silver medalist, Berinchyk was a part of the Ukraine national team, topped the medal table.

==== Highlights ====
2011 World Amateur Boxing Championships
Event	Round	Result	Opponent	Score
Light Welterweight	First	Win	(Cuba) Roniel Solotongo	+19–19
Light Welterweight	Second	Win	(Ecuador) Anderson Rojas	26–13
Light Welterweight	Third	Win	(Spain) Jonathan Alonso	27–10
Light Welterweight	Quarterfinal	Win	(Azerbaijan) Heybatulla Hajialiyev	33–19
Light Welterweight	Semifinal	Win	(England) Tom Stalker	33–18
Light Welterweight	Final	Loss	(Brazil) Everton Lopes	23–26

=== 2012 Summer Olympics ===
At the 2012 Summer Olympics, he had a bye into the second round, where he beat Anthony Yigit. He went on to beat Jeff Horn and then Uranchimegiin Mönkh-Erdene in the semi-final. In the final he lost to Roniel Iglesias, 15–22.

== Professional boxing career ==
Berinchyk made his professional debut against Tarik Madni on 29 August 2015. He won the fight by a fourth-round stoppage, as Madni retired at the end of the round. Berinchyk amassed a 7–0 record during the next two years, with four stoppage victories.

Berinchyk was booked to face Allan Vallespin for the vacant WBO Oriental lightweight title on 16 December 2017, in the main event of a card which took place at the Ice Palace Terminal in Brovary, Ukraine. He won the fight by a dominant sixth-round knockout. Berinchyk made his first WBO Oriental title defense against Jose Luis Prieto on 23 June 2018. He won the fight by a sixth-round stoppage, as Prieto retired at the end of the round.

Berinchyk was scheduled to face for the vacant WBO International lightweight title Rosekie Cristobal on 22 December 2018. He won the fight by a seventh-round technical knockout. Berinchyk made his first WBO International title defense against the veteran Nihito Arakawa on 20 April 2019. He won the fight by unanimous decision, with scores of 120–107, 118–109 and 120–107. Berinchyk made his second title defense against Patricio Lopez Moreno on 5 October 2019. He won the fight by unanimous decision, with scores of 120–109, 120–108 and 120–108.

Berinchyk was booked to make his third title defense against the 21–1 Hector Edgardo Sarmiento on 22 February 2020. He won the fight by unanimous decision, with scores of 117–112, 118–110 and 117–111. Berinchyk made his fourth WBO International title defense against Viorel Simion on 8 October 2020. Simion retired from the bout at the end of the seventh round.

Berinchyk made the fifth defense of his WBO regional title against Jose Sanchez on 21 March 2021. He made quick work of Sanchez, as he won the fight by a third-round technical knockout. Berinchyk made his sixth title defense against the former WBO International titleholder Isa Chaniev on 19 December 2021. He won the fight by unanimous decision, with scores of 118–112, 116–112 and 118–111.

=== WBO Lightweight Champion ===
==== Berinchyk vs. Navarrete ====
Berinchyk was scheduled to face Emanuel Navarrete for the vacant WBO lightweight title at Pechanga Arena in San Diego, California on 18 May 2024. Berinchyk won the fight by split decision with the scores 115–113, 116–112, 112–116.

==== Berinchyk vs. Davis ====
Berinchyk was scheduled to make the first defense of his WBO lightweight title against Keyshawn Davis on 14 February 2025 in New York. Berinchyk lost the fight by knockout in the fourth round with a left body shot. Prior to the bout Davis stated that the Berinchyk camp gave him a gift of bananas and watermelon.

==== Berinchyk vs. Noakes ====
Berinchyk faced former world title challenger Sam Noakes at The O2 Arena in London, England, on 29 August 2026. He lost the fight, which was for the vacant WBO International lightweight title, by unanimous decision.

== Professional boxing record ==
21 fights	19 wins	2 losses
By knockout	9	1
By decision	10	1

No.	Result	Record	Opponent	Type	Round, time	Date	Location	Notes
21	Loss	19–2	Sam Noakes	UD	10	29 Aug 2026	The O2 Arena, London, England	For vacant WBO International lightweight title
20	Loss	19–1	Keyshawn Davis	TKO	4 (12), 1:45	14 Feb 2025	The Theater at Madison Square Garden, New York City, New York, U.S.	Lost WBO lightweight title
19	Win	19–0	Emanuel Navarrete	SD	12	18 May 2024	Pechanga Arena, San Diego, California, U.S.	Won vacant WBO lightweight title
18	Win	18–0	Anthony Yigit	UD	12	26 Aug 2023	Stadion Wrocław, Wrocław, Poland	Retained WBO International lightweight title
17	Win	17–0	Yvan Mendy	UD	12	3 Dec 2022	Tottenham Hotspur Stadium, London, England	Retained WBO International lightweight title; Won European lightweight title
16	Win	16–0	Isa Chaniev	UD	12	19 Dec 2021	Ice Palace Terminal, Brovary, Ukraine	Retained WBO International lightweight title
15	Win	15–0	Jose Sanchez	TKO	3 (12), 0:35	21 Mar 2021	Ice Palace Terminal, Brovary, Ukraine	Retained WBO International lightweight title
14	Win	14–0	Viorel Simion	RTD	7 (10), 3:00	8 Oct 2020	Equides Club, Lisnyky, Ukraine	Retained WBO International lightweight title
13	Win	13–0	Hector Edgardo Sarmiento	UD	12	22 Feb 2020	Ice Palace Terminal, Brovary, Ukraine	Retained WBO International lightweight title
12	Win	12–0	Patricio Lopez Moreno	UD	12	5 Oct 2019	Ice Palace Terminal, Brovary, Ukraine	Retained WBO International lightweight title
11	Win	11–0	Nihito Arakawa	UD	12	20 Apr 2019	Sport Palace, Kyiv, Ukraine	Retained WBO International lightweight title
10	Win	10–0	Rosekie Cristobal	TKO	7 (12), 2:44	22 Dec 2018	Ice Palace Terminal, Brovary, Ukraine	Won vacant WBO International lightweight title
9	Win	9–0	Jose Luis Prieto	RTD	6 (10), 3:00	23 Jun 2018	Sport Palace, Kyiv, Ukraine	Retained WBO Oriental lightweight title
8	Win	8–0	Allan Vallespin	KO	6 (10), 1:53	16 Dec 2017	Ice Palace Terminal, Brovary, Ukraine	Won vacant WBO Oriental lightweight title
7	Win	7–0	Ismael Garcia	TKO	6 (8), 3:00	16 Sep 2017	AKKO International, Kyiv, Ukraine	
6	Win	6–0	Lorenzo Parra	UD	8	10 Jun 2017	Sporthall Budakalász, Budakalász, Hungary	
5	Win	5–0	Juan Ocura	UD	8	12 Nov 2016	Ice Palace Terminal, Brovary, Ukraine	
4	Win	4–0	Emiliano Martin Garcia	TKO	4 (6), 2:56	23 Apr 2016	Sport Palace, Kyiv, Ukraine	
3	Win	3–0	Gyorgy Mizsei Jr.	UD	6	12 Dec 2015	Sport Palace, Kyiv, Ukraine	
2	Win	2–0	Innocent Anyanwu	TKO	6 (6), 1:36	14 Nov 2015	Ice Palace Terminal, Brovary, Ukraine	
1	Win	1–0	Tarik Madni	RTD	4 (6), 3:00	29 Aug 2015	Sport Palace, Kyiv, Ukraine	

== Bare knuckle boxing career ==
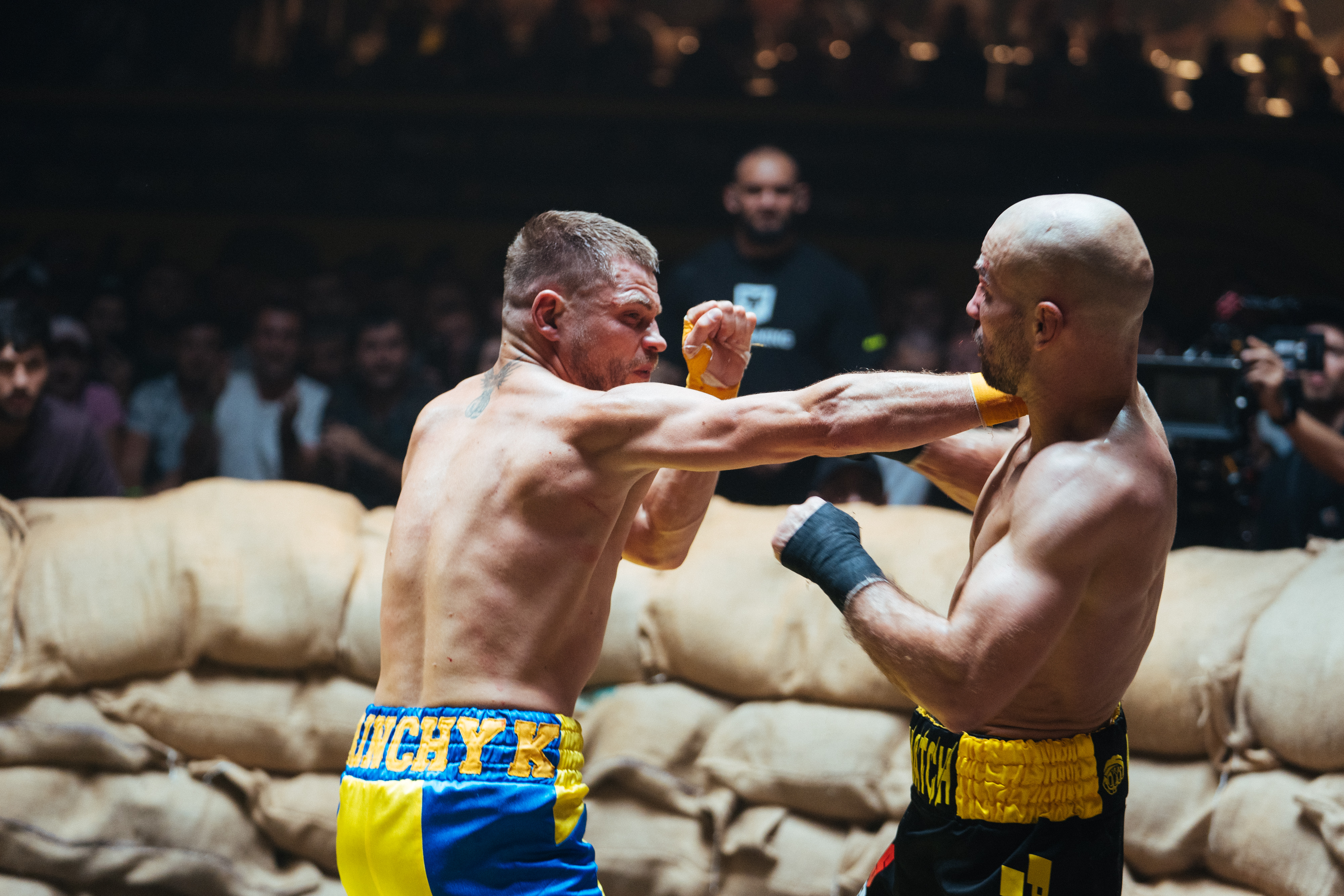
Berinchyk (left) in a bare-knuckle fight

Berinchyk made his bare-knuckle boxing debut against the former UFC fighter Artem Lobov at Mahatch FC 6 on 24 July 2021. Lobov retired from the bout at the end of the fourth round.

== Bare knuckle record ==
Professional record breakdown
1 match	1 win	0 losses
By knockout	1	0

Res.	Record	Opponent	Method	Event	Date	Round	Time	Location	Notes
Win	1–0	(Russia) Artem Lobov	TKO (retirement)	Mahatch FC 6	24 July 2021	4	2:00	Kyiv, Ukraine	

== See also ==
- List of world lightweight boxing champions

Sporting positions
Regional boxing titles
Vacant Title last held by Juan Martin Elorde	WBO Oriental lightweight champion 16 December 2017 – 22 December 2018; Won international title	Vacant Title next held by Jacob Ng
Vacant Title last held by Isa Chaniev	WBO International lightweight champion 22 December 2018 – 2024; Vacated	Vacant Title next held by Sam Noakes
Preceded by Yvan Mendy	European lightweight champion 3 December 2022 – 2023; Vacated	Vacant Title next held by Gavin Gwynne
World boxing titles
Vacant Title last held by Devin Haney	WBO lightweight champion 18 May 2024 – 14 Feb 2025	Succeeded by Keyshawn Davis
