= Vincenzo Mangiacapre =

Italian boxer (born 1989)

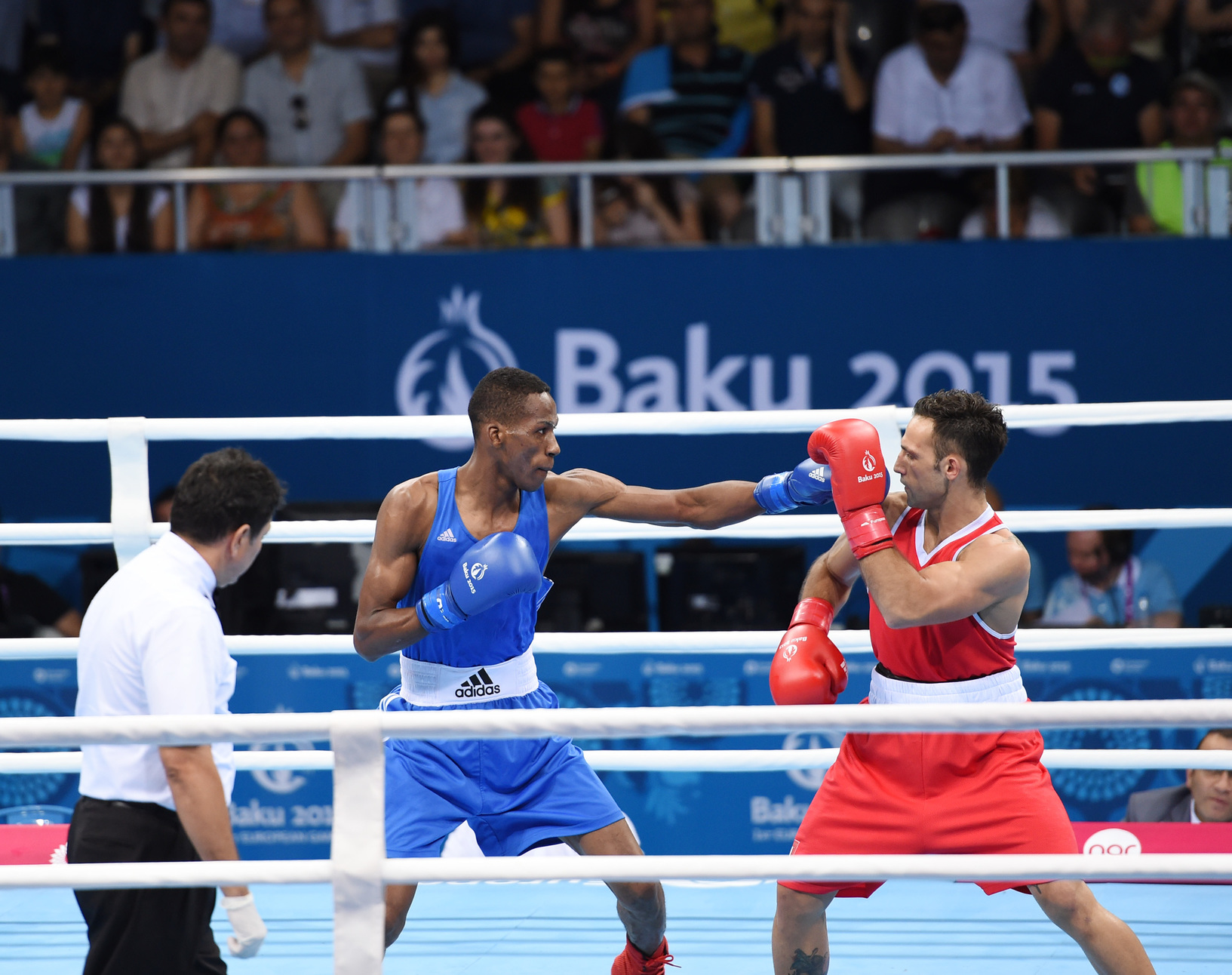
- Vincenzo Mangiacapre (red) during the 1st European Games

Personal information
- Born: 17 January 1989 (age 37) Marcianise, Italy
- Height: 1.71 m (5 ft 7 in)

Boxing career
- Weight class: Super welterweight

Boxing record
- Total fights: 3
- Wins: 3
- Win by KO: 0
- Losses: 0
- Draws: 0
- No contests: 0
Medal record
Men's amateur boxing
Representing Italy
Olympic Games
Bronze medal – third place	2012 London	Light welterweight
World Championships
Bronze medal – third place	2011 Baku	Light welterweight

Vincenzo Mangiacapre (born 17 January 1989 in Marcianise) is an Italian boxer, who won bronze at the 2011 World Amateur Boxing Championships and the 2012 Olympics.

== Biography ==
In June he won Bronze at the 2011 European Amateur Boxing Championships where he lost to Thomas Stalker. At the 2011 World Amateur Boxing Championships in September he beat three opponents before losing to Éverton Lopes 7:16. He qualified for the Olympics.

At the Olympics (results) he beat Gyula Káté 20:14 and Daniyar Yeleussinov 16:12 but lost to Cuban star Roniel Iglesias 8:15 in the semifinal and won bronze. Mangiacapre won a silver medal in the men's 64 kg (light welterweight) boxing event at the 2015 European Games in Baku, Azerbaijan. He reached the final but was defeated by Collazo Sotomayor of Azerbaijan with a score of 3–0.

Mangiacapre lost in the second round of the 2016 Rio Olympics due to an injury. He competed in the men's welterweight category, but was forced to withdraw from his second-round bout with Venezuela's Gabriel Maestre because of a fractured cheekbone.
