= Boxing at the 2011 Pan American Games – Light welterweight =

Men's light welterweight at the 2011 Pan American Games
- Venue: Expo Guadalajara Arena
- Dates: October 21 – 28
- Competitors: 12 from 12 nations

Medalists
Gold medal	Roniel Iglesias	Cuba
Silver medal	Valentino Knowles	Bahamas
Bronze medal	Éverton Lopes	Brazil
Bronze medal	Joelvis Hernandes	Venezuela

The men's light welterweight competition of the boxing events at the 2011 Pan American Games in Guadalajara, Mexico, was held between October 21 and 28 at the Expo Guadalajara Arena. The defending champion was Karl Dargan from the United States. Light welterweights were limited to those boxers weighing less than or equal to 64 kilograms.

Like all Pan American boxing events, the competition was a straight single-elimination tournament. Both semifinal losers were awarded bronze medals, so no boxers competed again after their first loss. Bouts consisted of four rounds of two minutes each, with one-minute breaks between rounds. Punches scored only if the white area on the front of the glove made full contact with the front of the head or torso of the opponent. Five judges scored each bout; three of the judges had to signal a scoring punch within one second for the punch to score. The winner of the bout was the boxer who scored the most valid punches by the end of the bout.

== Results ==
All times are Central Standard Time (UTC-6).

=== Bracket ===
Round of 16; October 21, 2011; 18:00
Cesar Rivas (PAN)	10
Joelvis Hernandes (VEN)	14
Luis Amador (NCA)	7
Valentino Knowles (BAH)	17
Éverton Lopes (BRA)	RSCH
Ricardo Garcia (DOM)
Juan Pablo Romero (MEX)	10
Roniel Iglesias (CUB)	17

Quarterfinals; October 22, 2011; 18:00
Anderson Rojas (ECU)	9
Joelvis Hernandes (VEN)	10
Valentino Knowles (BAH)	17+
Fabián Maidana (ARG)	17
Antonio Ortiz (PUR)
Éverton Lopes (BRA)	RET
Roniel Iglesias (CUB)	19
Jose Virula Lopez (GUA)	10

Semifinals; October 25, 2011; 19:00
Joelvis Hernandes (VEN)	6
Valentino Knowles (BAH)	11
Éverton Lopes (BRA)	9
Roniel Iglesias (CUB)	18

Finals; October 28, 2011; 19:00
Valentino Knowles (BAH)	14
Roniel Iglesias (CUB)	22
