= Jean Pascal vs. Lucian Bute =

Boxing competition

- Date: January 18, 2014
- Venue: Bell Centre, Montreal, Quebec, Canada
- Title(s) on the line: NABF and vacant WBC Diamond Light Heavyweight titles

Tale of the tape
Boxer	(Canada) Jean Pascal	(Romania) Lucian Bute
Nickname		Le Tombeur; Mister KO
Hometown	Port-au-Prince, Ouest, Haïti	Pechea, Galați County, Romania
Pre-fight record	28-2-1 (17 KO)	31-1 (24 KO)
Height	5 ft 11 in (1.80 m)	6 ft 1.5 in (1.87 m)
Weight	175 lb (79 kg)	175 lb (79 kg)
Style	Orthodox	Southpaw
Recognition	WBC; No. 2 Ranked Light Heavyweight; WBO; No. 7 Ranked Light Heavyweight; IBF; No. 11 Ranked Light Heavyweight	WBC; No. 3 Ranked Light Heavyweight; WBO; No. 8 Ranked Light Heavyweight

Result
- Pascal beats Bute by unanimous decision.

Jean Pascal vs. Lucian Bute was a boxing light heavyweight Diamond championship fight for the vacant WBC Diamond title which took place on January 18, 2014 at the Bell Centre in Montreal, Quebec, Canada. The bout, originally slated for May 25, 2013, had to be postponed after Bute underwent surgery to remove bone chips in his left hand.

The co-production of Yvon Michel's GYM and Jean Bédard's Interbox promotions and televised via HBO, has trumped a proposed HBO-televised rematch between Jean Pascal and RING and WBC 175-pound champion Chad Dawson that was slated for the same date at Bell Centre in Montreal. Lucian Bute had the right to face Carl Froch in a contractually obligated rematch for the IBF Super Middleweight belt, but passed on that, freeing the Englishman to face Mikkel Kessler.

It was the biggest fight in Canadian history since 1980, when Roberto Durán won a 15-round decision to win the welterweight world title in his first fight against Sugar Ray Leonard at Montreal's Olympic Stadium in front of 46,000 spectators. Bute, who is fighting out of Montreal, versus Pascal was pitting the two biggest draws and most popular fighters in Canadian boxing who are considered huge stars in Quebec. Pascal ended up winning the fight by unanimous decision.

== Background ==
=== Pascal ===
Pascal came off a unanimous-decision triumph over Aleksy Kuziemski in December 2012 that helped him to rebound from the unanimous-decision loss to Bernard Hopkins in May 2011.

=== Bute ===
Bute came off a unanimous-decision victory over previously unbeaten Denis Grachev in November 2012, which helped him to rebound from last May's fifth-round knockout loss to Froch that dethroned him as titleholder.

== Reported fight earnings ==
- Jean Pascal $2,000,000 vs. Lucian Bute $2,000,000

== Fight Card ==
Fight card
Weight Class				Result	Round	Time	Notes
Light Heavyweight	(Canada) Jean Pascal	vs.	(Romania) Lucian Bute				WBC Diamond Light Heavyweight Championship belt
Heavyweight	(Cuba) Mike Perez	vs.	(Cameroon) Carlos Takam
Light Heavyweight	(Colombia) Eleider Álvarez	vs.	(Canada) Andrew Gardiner
Bantamweight	(Canada) Sebastien Gauthier	vs.	(Mexico) Javier Franco
Welterweight	(Canada) Mikaël Zewski	vs.	(Poland) Krzysztof Szot
Light Middleweight	(Canada) Sebastien Bouchard	vs.	(Italy) Giuseppe Lauri
Light Welterweight	(Canada) Yves Ulysse Jr.	vs.	(Belgium) Evaggelos Tsirimokos
Heavyweight	(Colombia) Oscar Rivas	vs.	(Barbados) Shawn Cox
Light Heavyweight	(Russia) Artur Beterbiev	vs.	(France) Gabriel Lecrosnier

== International Broadcasting ==
Country / Region	Broadcaster
Australia	Main Event
Brazil	SporTV
Canada	Indigo
Croatia	Fight Channel
France	Canal+ Sport
Hungary	Sport 1
Poland	Polsat Sport
Romania	Digi Sport
United States	HBO
United Kingdom	Sky Sports
