= 2011 European Amateur Boxing Championships =

Boxing competitions

- Venue: Ankara Arena
- Location: Ankara, Turkey
- Dates: 17–24 June
- Competitors: 258 from 39 nations

The Men's 2011 European Amateur Boxing Championships was held in Ankara, Turkey from June 17 to June 24, 2011. It was the 39th edition of this biennial competition organised by the European governing body for amateur boxing, the EUBC.

== Schedule ==
From 17 June–19 June the preliminaries were held, on June 20–21 the quarterfinals in all categories were held. The semifinals took place on June 23 with the finals at June 24.

Seventeen-year-old Salman Alizadeh from Azerbaijan became the youngest gold medal winner in the European Boxing Championships since Mario Bianchini in 1930.

== Medal table ==
* Host nation (Turkey)

| Rank | Nation | Gold | Silver | Bronze | Total |
|---|---|---|---|---|---|
| 1 | Russia | 2 | 4 | 0 | 6 |
| 2 | Azerbaijan | 2 | 0 | 1 | 3 |
| 3 | Ireland | 2 | 0 | 0 | 2 |
| 3 | Wales | 2 | 0 | 0 | 2 |
| 5 | Turkey* | 1 | 1 | 2 | 4 |
| 6 | Moldova | 1 | 0 | 1 | 2 |
| 7 | Italy | 0 | 2 | 2 | 4 |
| 8 | Bulgaria | 0 | 1 | 1 | 2 |
| 8 | England | 0 | 1 | 1 | 2 |
| 10 | Belarus | 0 | 1 | 0 | 1 |
| 11 | Georgia | 0 | 0 | 3 | 3 |
| 12 | Romania | 0 | 0 | 2 | 2 |
| 13 | Armenia | 0 | 0 | 1 | 1 |
| 13 | Croatia | 0 | 0 | 1 | 1 |
| 13 | France | 0 | 0 | 1 | 1 |
| 13 | Germany | 0 | 0 | 1 | 1 |
| 13 | Hungary | 0 | 0 | 1 | 1 |
| 13 | Latvia | 0 | 0 | 1 | 1 |
| 13 | Ukraine | 0 | 0 | 1 | 1 |
| Totals (19 entries) | | 10 | 10 | 20 | 40 |

== Medalists ==
| Event | Gold | Silver | Bronze |
|---|---|---|---|
| Light Flyweight (–49 kg) | Salman Alizade; Azerbaijan | Belik Galanov; Russia | Georgi Andonov; Bulgaria Charlie Edwards; England |
| Flyweight (–52 kg) | Andrew Selby; Wales | Georgy Balakshin; Russia | Alexander Riscan; Moldova Vincenzo Picardi; Italy |
| Bantamweight (–56 kg) | Veaceslav Gojan; Moldova | Dmitriy Polyanskiy; Russia | Razvan Andreiana; Romania Furkan Ulaş Memiş; Turkey |
| Lightweight (–60 kg) | Fatih Keleş; Turkey | Domenico Valentino; Italy | Vladimir Saruhanyan; Armenia Volodymyr Matviychuk; Ukraine |
| Light Welterweight (–64 kg) | Ray Moylette; Ireland | Tom Stalker; England | Vincenzo Mangiacapre; Italy Heybatulla Hajialiyev; Azerbaijan |
| Welterweight (–69 kg) | Fred Evans; Wales | Mahamed Nurudzinau; Belarus | Adriani Vastine; France Zaal Kvachatadze; Georgia |
| Middleweight (–75 kg) | Maxim Koptyakov; Russia | Adem Kılıçcı; Turkey | Dschaba Chositaschwili; Georgia Anars Mursudovs; Latvia |
| Light Heavyweight (–81 kg) | Joe Ward; Ireland | Nikita Ivanov; Russia | Imre Szellő; Hungary Hrvoje Sep; Croatia |
| Heavyweight (–91 kg) | Teymur Mammadov; Azerbaijan | Tervel Pulev; Bulgaria | Bahram Muzaffer; Turkey Johann Witt; Germany |
| Super Heavyweight (+91 kg) | Magomed Omarov; Russia | Roberto Cammarelle; Italy | Mikheil Bakhtidze; Georgia Mihai Nistor; Romania |

== See also ==
- 2011 Women's European Amateur Boxing Championships
