= Boxing at the 2010 South American Games – Men's 60kg =

The Men's 57 kg event at the 2010 South American Games had its quarterfinals held on March 22, the semifinals on March 24 and the final on March 27.

== Medalists ==
Gold	Silver	Bronze
César Villarraga; Colombia	Éverton Lopes; Brazil	Erick Bone Banguera; Ecuador; Juan Carrasco; Argentina

== Results ==
First Round
Luis Miranda Garcia (PER)	0
César Villarraga (COL)	11

Quarterfinals
Juan Carrasco (ARG)	20
Humberto Guarachi (BOL)	10
Éverton Lopes (BRA)	RSC
Daniel Muñoz Tapia (CHI)
Erick Bone Banguera (ECU)	RSC
Omir Rodriguez (PAN)
Héctor Manzanilla (VEN)	6
César Villarraga (COL)	22

Semifinals
Juan Carrasco (ARG)
Éverton Lopes (BRA)	RSC
Erick Bone Banguera (ECU)	6
César Villarraga (COL)	14

Final
Éverton Lopes (BRA)	3
César Villarraga (COL)	7
