= César Villarraga =

Colombian boxer (born 1985)

Personal information
- Nickname: el cafetero
- Nationality: Colombian
- Born: September 22, 1985 (age 41) Bogotá, Colombia
- Height: 175 cm (5 ft 9 in)
- Weight: Lightweight

Boxing career
- Stance: Orthodox

Boxing record
- Total fights: 15
- Wins: 10
- Win by KO: 4
- Losses: 4
- Draws: 1
Medal record
Men's boxing
Representing Colombia
South American Games
Gold medal – first place	2010 Medellín	Lightweight

César Andres Villarraga (born September 22, 1985) is a Colombian professional boxer. As an amateur, he won a gold medal at the 2010 South American Games and qualified for the 2012 Olympics.

At the 2010 South American Games he made good use of home advantage to beat Héctor Manzanilla and Eric Bandega before defeating the future World Champion Éverton Lopes. He has yet to repeat that success. At the 2010 Central American and Caribbean Games he won silver.

At the 2011 Pan American Games he lost his very first bout against Angel Suarez. At the 2011 World Amateur Boxing Championships he again lost in the first round to Javkhlan Bariadi.

At the Olympic qualifier he won two fights to qualify, then lost to Roniel Iglesias at the 2012 Olympics.
