= Emil Israfilbekov =

Azerbaijani boxer

Emil İsrafilbəyov
Personal information
- Height: 188 cm (6 ft 2 in)

Boxing career

Boxing record
- Wins: 22
- Win by KO: 17
- Losses: 2

Emil Israfilbeyov also known as Emil Baku (April 27, 1972 – January 18, 2016) was an Azerbaijani boxer.

== Biography ==
- Emil Israfilbeyov was born in Baku in 1972. Emil and his brother Rufat Israfilbeyov moved to the United States in the early 1990s. Both brothers, who were engaged in professional boxing, chose the nickname "Baku" for themselves.
- The boxer, who achieved success under the name "Emil Baku", was struggling with brain cancer.
- A charity campaign was launched on social networks to help Emil overcome this disease. EBA European champion Azerbaijani professional boxer Agali Alishov put his championship belt up for sale in the name of "Emil Baku", but Emil died in 2016 after a long illness.

== Boxing career ==
Emil Israfilbeyov – Fought 24 bouts in his career and lost only 2 of them.

2003.09.16 – Tokunbo Olajide	Loss
2003.05.10 – Cardyl Finley	Win
2002.01.17 – Shakir Ashanti	Win
2001.08.17 – Ronald Weaver	Win
2000.09.15 – Anthony Perry	Win
2000.06.23 – Derrick Graham	Loss
2000.04.28 – Floyd Weaver	Win
2000.03.24 – Anthony Ivory	Win
2000.02.29 – Scott Sala	Win
1999.12.01 – Darryl Lattimore	Win
1999.10.01 – Rick Edson	Win
1998.06.25 – Alonzo Brown	Win
1998.03.26 – Benji Singleton	Win
1998.03.10 – Richard Grant	Win
1997.10.29 – Robert Muhammad	Win
1997.09.12 – Ken Blackston	Win
1997.08.07 – Julio Jimenez	Win
1997.04.08 – Bernard Robinson	Win
1997.03.13 – Jim Maloney	Win
1997.01.23 – Leon Rouse	Win
1995.12.19 – Michael Jackson	Win
1995.12.09 – John Brown	Win
1995.11.30 – Curtis Alston	Win
1995.11.11 – Travis Clybourn	Win

== See also ==
- List of Azerbaijani boxers
- Mahammad Abdullayev
