= Davitt College =

- Coláiste Dáibhéid

Location
- Gorteendrunagh, Springfield, Castlebar, County Mayo, Ireland; 53°51′26″N 9°17′26″W

Information
- Motto: "A dynamic and vibrant centre of teaching and learning"
- Principal: Conor O Reilly
- Deputy principal: Anita Gallagher, William Rowan
- Teaching staff: 80 approx. (2018)
- Enrollment: 800 approx. (2018)
- Language: English (mandatory); Irish (mandatory; with exceptions); French (optional); German (optional)
- Website: davittcollege.com

Davitt College (Irish: Coláiste Dáibhéid) is a mixed vocational secondary school located in Gorteendrunagh, Springfield, Castlebar, County Mayo, Ireland.

== History ==
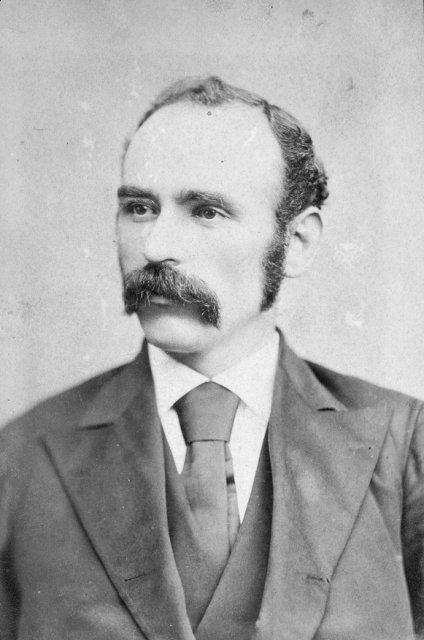
Michael Davitt, circa. 1878

The school, which opened in 1984 would previously be known as 'the tech', would later be named Davitt College by then-principal Joe Langan because "he [Langan] did not like the term ‘tech’ with its derogatory connotations". He had also introduced the school uniform, the first in any vocational school in Ireland as he stated 'was an indication of things to come.' Joe Langan died in July 2006 and in 2011 Davitt College named their new sports hall after him.

The school is named after Michael Davitt, an Irish republican and agrarian campaigner who founded the Irish National Land League. He was also a labour leader, Home Rule politician and Member of Parliament (MP). He campaigned for Home Rule and was a close ally of Charles Stuart Parnell, the leader of the Irish Parliamentary Party, until the party split over Parnell's divorce and Davitt joined the anti-Parnellite Irish National Federation.

The school was run under authority by the VEC until July 2013 when it was replaced by the ETB.

A student who attended Davitt College named Shane Gavin never missed a single day of school in a space of 13 years since he started primary school.

Davitt College was one of the first schools in the Republic of Ireland to introduce Politics and Society as a Leaving Certificate subject in September 2016, with the inaugural examination taking place in June 2018.

The school is a member of Mayo, Sligo and Leitrim ETB since 2013.

== Notable alumni ==
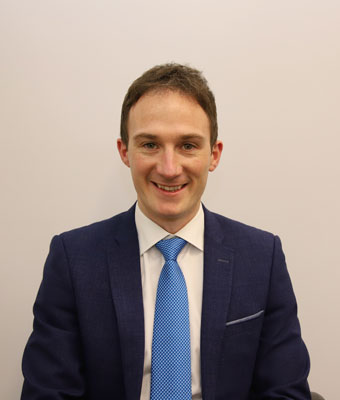
Politician Alan Dillon attended the school

- Alan Dillon, Fine Gael politician (TD) (2020–present), and former Gaelic footballer for Mayo (2003–2017), All Star winner (2006, 2012).
- Ray Moylette, professional boxer.
- Diarmuid O'Connor, Gaelic footballer for Mayo, All Stars Young Footballer of the Year (2015–2016).
- Cora Staunton, Gaelic footballer for Mayo (1995–2018), All-Ireland winner (1999–2000, 2002–2003), All Star winner (2000–2002, 2004, 2007–2009, 2012–2013, 2015, 2017), association footballer, rugby player and Australian rules footballer, Greater Western Sydney Giants (2018–present).

== See also ==
- Education in the Republic of Ireland
