= Furkan Ulaş Memiş =

Turkish boxer (born 1991)

Personal information
- Nationality: Turkish
- Born: April 22, 1991 (age 35) Trabzon, Turkey
- Height: 1.67 m (5.5 ft)
- Weight: 51 kg (112 lb)

Sport
- Country: Turkey
- Sport: Amateur boxing
- Event: Bantamweight
- Club: Istanbul Tekel
Medal record
European Amateur Championships
| Bronze medal – third place | 2011 Ankara | Bantamweight |
World University Boxing Championships
| Gold medal – first place | 2010 Ulaanbaatar | Bantamweight |

Furkan Ulaş Memiş (born April 22, 1991) is a Turkish amateur boxer competing in the bantamweight division.

Memiş was born in Trabzon. At 1.67 m (5.5 ft), he weighs 51 kg (112 lb).

He competed at the 2008 Olympics in flyweight but was defeated in his first bout by Indian Jitender Kumar. At the 2011 European Amateur Championships held in Ankara, Turkey, he won the bronze medal.
