= Yves Ulysse Jr. =

Canadian boxer

Personal information
- Born: July 29, 1988 (age 37) Montreal, Quebec, Canada
- Height: 1.70 m (5 ft 7 in)
- Weight: Light welterweight

Boxing career
- Stance: Orthodox

Boxing record
- Total fights: 25
- Wins: 22
- Win by KO: 12
- Losses: 3

Yves Ulysse Jr. (born July 29, 1988) is a Canadian professional boxer. As an amateur, he competed at two editions of the World Championships in 2011 and 2013, both at light welterweight.

== Amateur career ==
As a teenager, Yves practiced various sports such as basketball, football and taekwondo. Around the age of 17 he heard about Floyd Mayweather Jr. who earned $35 million. When he first heard this he said to himself, "I am fighting in the street for any dollar and he (Floyd) makes 35 million for a fight. I want to make money too." So Yves began to train in Club De Boxe Champions of Montreal.

Yves spent three years on the Canadian national boxing team. He also won two Canadian Amateur Championships in the light welterweight category. He also participated in two world amateur championship tournaments in 2011 and 2013. He lost in the round of 32 at the 2011 tournament and in the round of 16 at the 2013 tournament. He also reached the quarterfinals at the 2010 Commonwealth Games in Delhi.

== Professional career ==
In December 2013, the 25-year-old boxer signed his first professional contract when he teamed up with InterBox. His first fight took place on 18 January 2014, when he was beaten on the undercard of the Pascal-Bute fight.

On 5 December 2019, Yves Ulysse Jr. lost to Ismael Barroso in a 12 round decision.

Since his defeat to Barroso, Yves has won four consecutive bouts, three coming by way of Knock-out.

== Professional boxing record ==
25 fights	22 wins	3 losses
By knockout	12	1
By decision	10	2

No.	Result	Record	Opponent	Type	Round, time	Date	Location	Notes
25	Loss	22–3	(Mexico) Gabriel Gollaz Valenzuela	TKO	1 (10), 0:52	Feb 2, 2023	Montreal Casino, Montreal, Canada	
24	Win	22–2	(Mexico) Jose Macias Enriquez	UD	10	Oct 27, 2022	Casino du Lac-Leamy, Gatineau, Canada	
23	Win	21–2	(Argentina) Reuquen Cona Facundo Arce	KO	3 (8), 1:59	Jun 23, 2022	Montreal Casino, Montreal, Canada	
22	Win	20–2	(Canada) David Theroux	TKO	5 (10), 1:11	Jul 16, 2021	Centre Gervais Auto, Shawinigan, Canada	Defended WBC–NABF light welterweight title
21	Win	19–2	(Canada) Mathieu Germain	TKO	7 (10), 2:46	Nov 11, 2020	Hotel Rimouski, Rimouski, Canada	Won vacant WBC–NABF light welterweight title
20	Loss	18–2	(Venezuela) Ismael Barroso	UD	10	Dec 5, 2019	(United States) The Hangar, Costa Mesa, California, U.S.	Lost WBA Gold light welterweight title
19	Win	18–1	(Canada) Steve Claggett	UD	10	Apr 25, 2019	(United States) Fantasy Springs Casino, Indio, California, U.S.	Won WBA Gold light welterweight title
18	Win	17–1	(United States) Maximilliano Becerra	UD	8	Dec 15, 2018	(United States) Madison Square Garden, New York City, New York, U.S.	
17	Win	16–1	(Venezuela) Ernesto Espana	UD	10	Jun 16, 2018	Centre Gervais Auto, Shawinigan, Canada	Won vacant WBC FECARBOX light welterweight title
16	Win	15–1	(United States) Cletus Seldin	UD	10	Dec 16, 2017	Place Bell, Laval, Canada	
15	Loss	14–1	(Canada) Steve Claggett	SD	10	Oct 27, 2017	MTelus, Montreal, Canada	For vacant IBF North American light welterweight title
14	Win	14–0	(Philippines) Ricky Sismundo	UD	10	Jun 17, 2017	Olympia Theatre, Montreal, Canada	
13	Win	13–0	(Puerto Rico) Zachary Ochoa	RTD	7 (10), 3:00	Mar 11, 2017	(United States) Turning Stone Resort Casino, Verona, New York, U.S.	Won vacant WBC–NABF Junior light welterweight title
12	Win	12–0	(Mexico) Jose Emilio Perea	UD	8	Jan 28, 2017	Bell Centre, Montreal, Canada	
11	Win	11–0	(Mexico) Francisco Javier Perez	KO	4 (8)	Sep 24, 2016	BMW Hamel, Montreal, Canada	
10	Win	10–0	(Mexico) Randy Lozano	TKO	5 (6)	Nov 28, 2015	Videotron Centre, Quebec City, Canada	
9	Win	9–0	(Canada) Ryan Wagner	TKO	2 (8)	Aug 15, 2015	Bell Centre, Montreal, Canada	
8	Win	8–0	(France) Renald Garrido	DQ	1 (4)	Jun 20, 2015	Bell Centre, Montreal, Canada	
7	Win	7–0	(Mexico) Noel Mejia Rincon	TKO	5 (8), 1:27	May 22, 2015	Colisée Isabelle-Brasseur, Saint-Jean-sur-Richelieu, Canada	
6	Win	6–0	(Barbados) Miguel Antoine	TKO	5 (8), 2:43	Mar 14, 2015	Bell Centre, Montreal, Canada	
5	Win	5–0	(Poland) Lukasz Janik	UD	8	Dec 6, 2014	Bell Centre, Montreal, Canada	
4	Win	4–0	(Poland) Krystian Huczko	UD	6	Sep 27, 2014	Bell Centre, Montreal, Canada	
3	Win	3–0	(Mexico) Hector Osornio	RTD	3 (6), 3:00	Aug 22, 2014	Complexe Sportif Sportscene, Mont-Saint-Hilaire, Canada	
2	Win	2–0	(Argentina) Carlos Alberto Olivera	TKO	1 (4), 1:38	May 24, 2014	Bell Centre, Montreal, Canada	
1	Win	1–0	(Belgium) Vango Tsirimokos	TKO	4 (4), 1:52	Jan 18, 2014	Bell Centre, Montreal, Canada	
