= Isa Chaniev =

Russian boxer

Isa Chaniev Иса Чаниев
Personal information
- Nationality: Russian
- Born: Иса Асхабович Чаниев; November 2, 1992 (age 33) Ordzhonikidzevskaya (now Sunzha), Sunzhensky, Ingushetia, Russia
- Height: 5 ft 7 in (170 cm)
- Weight: Lightweight

Boxing career
- Stance: Orthodox

Boxing record
- Total fights: 22
- Wins: 15
- Win by KO: 7
- Losses: 6
- Draws: 1

Isa Аskhabovich Chaniev (Russian: Иса Асханович Чаниев; born 2 November 1992, in Sunzhensky, Ingushetia) is a Russian professional boxer who competes in the lightweight division. He has held the IBF Inter-Continental and WBO International titles since 2017.

== Professional career ==
Isa Chaniev made his professional debut in 2015 at the age of 22. He won the IBF Youth super featherweight title in 2016, and amassed a record of 10 wins with half of them by stoppage.

On 25 May 2017, Chaniev faced Fedor Papazov for the latter's IBO and vacant IBF Inter-Continental lightweight titles in Riga, Latvia. The competitive fight resulted in a "razor-thin" unanimous decision win for Papazov. The scorecards were 115–114, 115-113 and 116–113. Chaniev's team protested the decision in addition to, what manager Khusein Buzurtanov described as, "the attempt to falsify the results of doping-control by the team of Papazov." On 9 July, it was reported the IBF had withdrawn its recognition of the title fight due to irregularities by Papazov's team during the post-fight drug testing.

Chaniev next faced Belgian veteran Jean-Pierre Bauwens for the vacant IBF Inter-Continental title on 26 August in Vilnius, Lithuania. He dominated Bauwens throughout the fight and won the bout by unanimous decision.

On 9 December, Chaniev defeated Filipino lightweight Juan Martin Elorde, grandson of Gabriel "Flash" Elorde, to claim the vacant WBO International title in Nazran, Ingushetia. Chaniev dominated Elorde throughout the fight before winning by technical knockout in the sixth round to successfully defend his IBF Inter-Continental title.

In April 2018, it was announced that Chaniev would defend his titles against Venezuelan veteran Ismael Barroso on 12 May in Riga, Latvia. He won the fight by unanimous decision.

== Professional boxing record ==
22 fights	15 wins	6 losses
By knockout	7	2
By decision	8	4
Draws	1	

No.	Result	Record	Opponent	Type	Round, Time	Date	Location	Notes
22	Loss	15–6–1	Vildan Minasov	RTD	6 (8), 3:00	10 Feb 2024	KRK “Uralets”, Ekaterinburg, Russia	
21	Loss	15–5–1	Ivan Kozlovsky	MD	10	8 Sep 2023	Traktor Sports Palace, Chelyabinsk, Russia	
20	Draw	15–4–1	Vyacheslav Gusev	SD	8	6 Aug 2022	RCC Boxing Academy, Ekaterinburg, Russia	
19	Loss	15–4	Denys Berinchyk	UD	12	18 Dec 2021	Ice Palace "Terminal", Brovari, Ukraine	For WBO International lightweight title.
18	Win	15–3	Nurtas Azhbenov	KO	3 (10), 0:45	10 Jul 2021	Baluan Sholak Sports Palace, Almaty, Kazakhstan	
17	Win	14–3	Vladyslav Melnyk	UD	10	23 Aug 2020	DiaMond, Minsk, Russia	
16	Loss	13–3	Pavel Malikov	MD	12	12 Oct 2019	Arena Riga, Riga, Latvia	For EBP lightweight title.
15	Loss	13–2	Richard Commey	TKO	2 (12), 0:39	2 Feb 2019	The Ford Center at The Star, Frisco, Texas, U.S.	For vacant IBF lightweight title.
14	Win	13–1	Ismael Barroso	UD	12	12 May 2018	Arena Riga, Riga, Latvia	Retained IBF Inter-Continental and WBO International lightweight titles.
13	Win	12–1	Juan Martin Elorde	TKO	6 (12), 1:52	9 Dec 2017	Evloev Sports Palace, Nazran, Russia	Retained IBF Inter-Continental lightweight title; Won vacant WBO International lightweight title.
12	Win	11–1	Jean Pierre Bauwens	UD	12	26 Aug 2017	Club Loftas, Vilnius, Lithuania	Won vacant IBF Inter-Continental lightweight title.
11	Loss	10–1	Fedor Papazov	UD	12	25 May 2017	Studio 69, Riga, Latvia	For IBO Inter-Continental and vacant IBF Inter-Continental lightweight titles.
10	Win	10–0	Rimar Metuda	UD	10	15 Dec 2016	Qin Shi Huang Restaurant, Saint Petersburg, Russia	Won vacant IBF Youth super-featherweight title.
9	Win	9–0	Ilya Reutski	UD	10	16 Nov 2016	Saturn Boxing Club, Saint Petersburg, Russia	
8	Win	8–0	Sherzodbek Mamajonov	TKO	3 (10), 2:10	23 Sep 2016	Olimp, Krasnodar, Russia	
7	Win	7–0	Andrei Sudas	KO	2 (10), 0:58	26 Aug 2016	Match Point Sport Bar, Moscow, Russia	
6	Win	6–0	Aleksandr Saltykov	RTD	5 (8), 3:00	22 Apr 2016	Pyynikin Palloiluhalli, Tampere, Finland	
5	Win	5–0	Firdavs Azimjonov	TKO	2 (8), 2:50	26 Feb 2016	Alexander Morozov Boxing School #1, Saint Petersburg, Russia	
4	Win	4–0	Arkadi Harutyunyan	UD	8	5 Dec 2015	Concert Hall "Russia", Pyatigorsk, Russia	
3	Win	3–0	Baskim Jakupi	KO	1 (6), 1:35	27 Jun 2015	Restaurant Chayka, Novorossiysk, Russia	
2	Win	2–0	Rustem Abdinanov	UD	4	25 Apr 2015	Wonderland, Novorossiysk, Russia	
1	Win	1–0	Alexander Andrushchenko	UD	4	31 Jan 2015	Boxing Gym, Krasnodar, Russia	

Sporting positions
Regional boxing titles
Vacant Title last held by Aphiwe Mboyiya	IBF Youth super featherweight champion 15 December 2016 – 2017; Vacated	Vacant Title next held by Serif Gurdijeljac
Vacant Title last held by Yvan Mendy	IBF Inter-Continental super featherweight champion 26 August 2017 – 2018; Vacated	Vacant Title next held by Lee Selby
