= List of Azerbaijani boxers =

This is a complete list of Azerbaijani boxers.

== A ==
- Jeyhun Abiyev
- Magomed Abdulhamidov
- Vugar Alakbarov
- Elchin Alizade
- Romal Amanov
- Magomed Aripgadjiev
- Fuad Aslanov

== G ==
- Gaybatulla Gadzhialiyev

== H ==
- Vatan Huseynli
- Rovshan Huseynov

== I ==
- Shahin Imranov
- Ali Ismailov

== K ==
- Ruslan Khairov

== M ==
- Magomedrasul Majidov
- Elvin Mamishzada
- Aghasi Mammadov
- Samir Mammadov
- Teymur Mammadov
- Soltan Migitinov

== T ==
- Javid Taghiyev

== V ==
- Elena Vystropova
