= Juan Miguel Elorde =

Filipino boxer

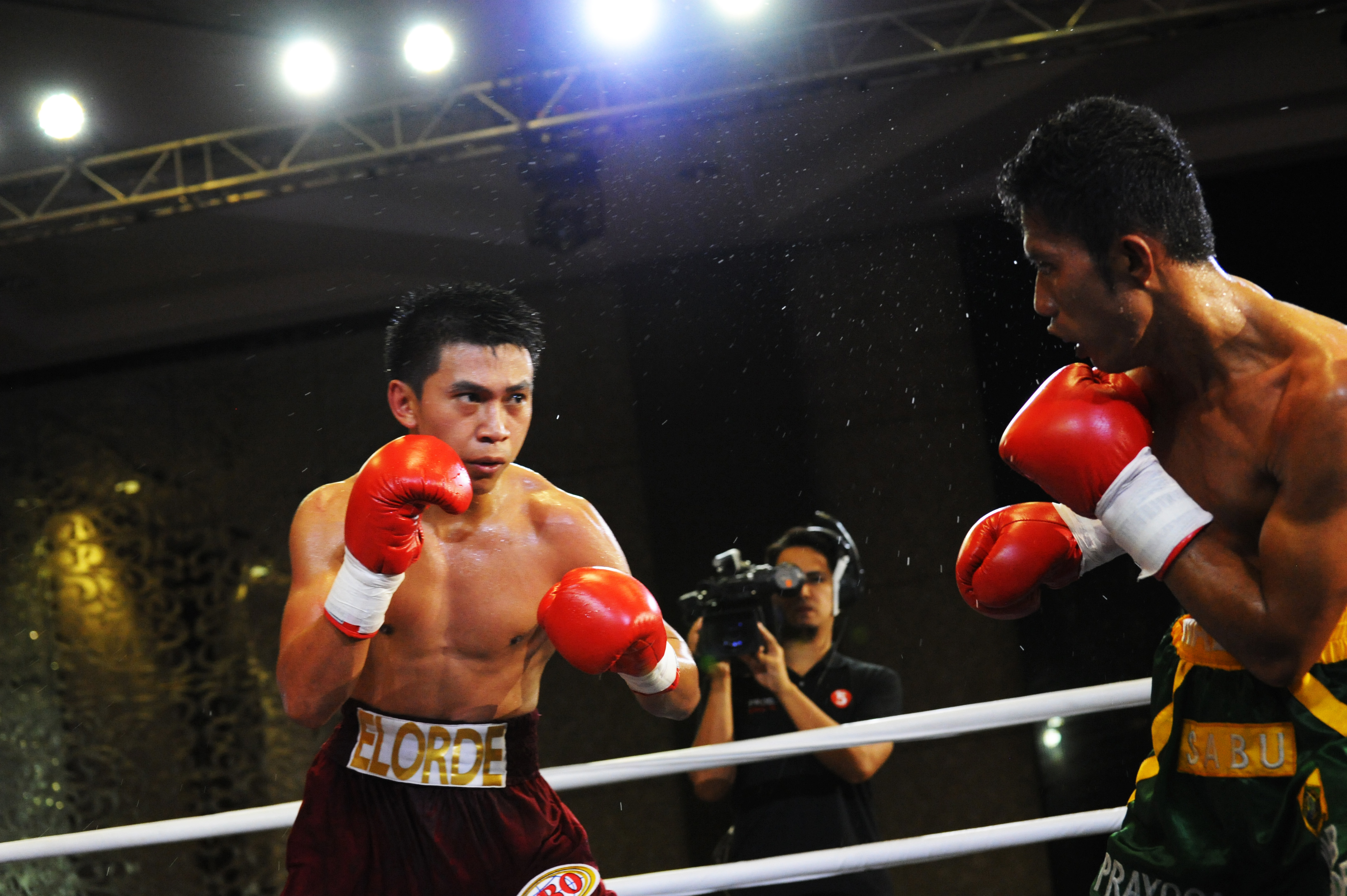
- MigElorde Elorde (L) in March 2016

Personal information
- Nicknames: "The Boss" "Mig"
- Nationality: Filipino
- Born: Juan Miguel Elorde; 25 October 1986 (age 39) Parañaque, Metro Manila, Philippines
- Height: 173 cm (5 ft 8 in)
- Weight: Super Bantamweight

Boxing career
- Stance: Orthodox

Boxing record
- Total fights: 31
- Wins: 29
- Win by KO: 15
- Losses: 3
- Draws: 0

Juan Miguel Elorde (born 25 October 1986) is a Filipino boxer. He is the reigning WBO Asia Pacific super bantamweight champion and goes undefeated since he won the championship title in 2015. He is currently ranked no. 4 WBO Super Bantamweight division. He is managed and promoted by his father Johnny Elorde. Currently trained by Toto Laurente of Palompon City, Leyte.

== Early years ==
Mig is the son of Johnny Elorde and grandson of late boxer Gabriel Elorde. He finished a Bachelor of Science degree in Hotel, Restaurant and Institution Management major in Culinary Arts at the De La Salle–College of Saint Benilde in 2008.

His brother Juan Martin Elorde is also a boxer and his other brother Nico Elorde is a professional basketball player in the Philippines playing in the PBA.

Mig and his brothers were introduced to boxing by his father as a way to induce discipline. He started fighting in amateur boxing at age 14. He turned professional boxer after he finished his college studies.

== Notable fights ==
Juan Miguel Elorde vs Tabthong Tor Buamas
Mig defeated former Thailand flyweight champion Tabthong Tor Buamas via unanimous decision to win the WBO Asia Pacific super bantamweight title. He outpointed the Thai in all rounds with his speed and combination shots to the Thai's body.

Mig is the third Filipino boxer to win the WBO regional title after Jesus Salud (1998) and Genesis Servania (2012).

== Professional boxing record ==
32 fights	29 wins	3 losses
By knockout	15	2
By decision	14	1

No.	Result	Record	Opponent	Type	Round, time	Date	Location	Notes
32	Loss	29–3	(Australia) Sam Goodman	TKO	8 (10), 1:26	20 Jul 2022	Hordern Pavilion, Sydney, Australia	For WBO Oriental super bantamweight title and IBF Inter-Continental super bantamweight title
31	Win	29–2	(Philippines) Aroel Romasasa	UD	6	23 Oct 2021	(Philippines) The Flash Grand Ballroom of the Elorde Sports Complex, Parañaque	
30	Loss	28–2	(Mexico) Emanuel Navarrete	TKO	4 (12), 0:26	14 Sep 2019	(United States) T-Mobile Arena, Paradise, Nevada, U.S.	For WBO super bantamweight title
29	Win	28–1	(Japan) Shohei Kawashima	UD	12	25 Mar 2019	(Philippines) Okada Manila Hotel and Casino, Parañaque	Retained WBO Asia Pacific super bantamweight title
28	Win	27–1	(Thailand) Artid Bamrungauea	TKO	7 (10)	16 Dec 2018	(Philippines) The Flash Grand Ballroom of the Elorde Sports Complex, Parañaque	
27	Win	26–1	(Thailand) Ratchanon Sawangsoda	KO	3 (6)	15 Jul 2018	(Malaysia) Axiata Arena, Kuala Lumpur	
26	Win	25–1	(Thailand) Likit Chane	UD	12	25 Feb 2018	(Philippines) The Flash Grand Ballroom of the Elorde Sports Complex, Parañaque	Retained WBO Asia Pacific super bantamweight title
25	Win	24–1	(Indonesia) Afrizal Tamboresi	KO	1 (10)	23 Sep 2017	(Philippines) The Flash Grand Ballroom of the Elorde Sports Complex, Parañaque	Retained WBO Asia Pacific super bantamweight title
24	Win	23–1	(Indonesia) Erick Deztroyer	TKO	6 (10)	25 Feb 2017	(Philippines) The Flash Grand Ballroom of the Elorde Sports Complex, Parañaque	Retained WBO Asia Pacific super bantamweight title
23	Win	22–1	(Indonesia) Junior Bajawa	UD	10	24 Sep 2016	(Philippines) Cafe Lupe, Barangay Mambugan, Antipolo City	
22	Win	21–1	(Indonesia) Waldo Sabu	UD	10	29 Mar 2016	(Philippines) Sofitel Plaza Hotel, Pasay, Metro Manila	Retained WBO Asia Pacific super bantamweight title
21	Win	20–1	(Indonesia) Rasmanudin	KO	4 (10), 1:00	12 Dec 2015	(Philippines) The Flash Grand Ballroom, Elorde Sports Complex, Parañaque, Metro Manila	
20	Win	19–1	(Indonesia) Arnold Mau	KO	1 (10), 1:20	12 Sep 2015	(Philippines) The Flash Grand Ballroom, Elorde Sports Complex, Parañaque, Metro Manila	
19	Win	18–1	(Thailand) Terdchai Duwangmontree	UD	10	25 Mar 2015	(Philippines) Manila Hotel, Manila, Metro Manila	Won vacant WBO Asia Pacific super bantamweight title
18	Win	17–1	(Indonesia) Oke Haryanto	TKO	1 (10), 0:46	29 Nov 2014	(Philippines) The Flash Grand Ballroom, Elorde Sports Complex, Parañaque, Metro Manila	
17	Win	16–1	(Indonesia) Paulus Baransano	TKO	5 (10), 2:19	22 Aug 2014	(Philippines) The Flash Grand Ballroom, Elorde Sports Complex, Parañaque, Metro Manila	
16	Win	15–1	(Indonesia) Budi risky	KO	1 (10), 2:11	25 Mar 2014	(Philippines) Sofitel Plaza Hotel, Pasay, Metro Manila	
15	Win	14–1	(Thailand) Chatri Sariphan	KO	5 (10), 1:14	14 Dec 2013	(Philippines) The Flash Grand Ballroom, Elorde Sports Complex, Parañaque, Metro Manila	
14	Win	13–1	(Thailand) Phissanuthep Chaiyonggym	TKO	6 (10), 1:02	10 Aug 2013	(Philippines) Midas Hotel and Casino, Pasay, Metro Manila	
13	Win	12–1	(Philippines) Ryan Soliveres	UD	8	24 Feb 2013	(Philippines) The Flash Grand Ballroom, Elorde Sports Complex, Parañaque, Metro Manila	
12	Win	11–1	(Philippines) Arjet Caballes	UD	6	29 Sep 2012	(Philippines) The Flash Grand Ballroom, Elorde Sports Complex, Parañaque, Metro Manila	
11	Loss	10–1	(United States) Jerry Guevara	UD	4	11 Nov 2012	(United States) Mandalay Bay Resort & Casino, Las Vegas, Nevada	
10	Win	10–0	(Indonesia) Saddam Eyo	TKO	3 (8), 2:24	11 Aug 2011	(Philippines) Sofitel Plaza Hotel, Pasay, Metro Manila	
9	Win	9–0	(Philippines) Richard Vasquez	TKO	1 (8), 1:22	5 Mar 2011	(Philippines) Metro Naga Coliseum, Naga City, Cebu	
8	Win	8–0	(Philippines) Richard Vasquez	UD	6	2 Oct 2010	(Philippines) The Flash Grand Ballroom, Elorde Sports Complex, Parañaque, Metro Manila	
7	Win	7–0	(Philippines) Anthony Balubar	KO	1 (6), 2:12	25 Mar 2010	(Philippines) Sofitel Plaza Hotel, Pasay, Metro Manila	
6	Win	6–0	(Philippines) Vic Racuma	UD	6	24 Oct 2009	(Philippines) The Flash Grand Ballroom, Elorde Sports Complex, Parañaque, Metro Manila	
5	Win	5–0	(Philippines) Bartolome Llona	UD	4	25 Jul 2009	(Philippines) The Flash Grand Ballroom, Elorde Sports Complex, Parañaque, Metro Manila	
4	Win	4–0	(Philippines) Ronilo Romasanta	UD	4	25 Mar 2009	(Philippines) Manila Hotel, Manila, Metro Manila	
3	Win	3–0	(Philippines) Dennis Lumacang	KO	1 (4), 0:28	31 Jan 2009	(Philippines) The Flash Grand Ballroom, Elorde Sports Complex, Parañaque, Metro Manila	
2	Win	2–0	(Philippines) Christian Golez	UD	4	15 Nov 2008	(Philippines) The Flash Grand Ballroom, Elorde Sports Complex, Parañaque, Metro Manila	
1	Win	1–0	(Philippines) Razem Laud	UD	4	31 May 2008	(Philippines) Cebu City Waterfront Hotell & Casino, Lahug Cebu City, Cebu	
