= Anthony Yigit =

Swedish boxer (born 1991)

Personal information
- Nicknames: Digit Yigit, Can You Dig It
- Born: 1 September 1991 (age 35) Farsta, Sweden
- Height: 171 cm (5 ft 7 in)
- Weight: Lightweight; Light welterweight; Welterweight

Boxing career
- Reach: 168 cm (66 in)
- Stance: Southpaw

Boxing record
- Total fights: 34
- Wins: 29
- Win by KO: 10
- Losses: 4
- Draws: 1

Anthony Yigit (born 1 September 1991) is a Swedish professional boxer who challenged for the IBF light welterweight title in 2018. As an amateur, following his success in 2011 World Amateur Boxing Championships, Yigit qualified for the 2012 Summer Olympics.

He is of Turkish, Finnish and Russian descent. He is a member of Hammarby IF and regularly trains with the club.

== Olympics ==
At the 2012 Summer Olympics, Yigit reached the second round, where he lost to Denys Berinchyk.

== Professional career ==
Yigit turned pro by signing with promotional company Team Sauerland in 2013. Touted as one of the most talented Swedish prospects in a while and a great addition to the 'Nordic Fight Nights' event organized by Team Sauerland, he went on to win his pro debut in Denmark on 13 April 2013.

On 11 February 2017, Yigit fought against veteran boxer Lenny Daws for the vacant European Super Lightweight title. Despite the hostile crowd in the UK, Yigit managed to masterfully outbox Daws to capture the title.

In 2017, Yigit had two notable unanimous decision wins against Spaniard Sandor Martin and Brit Joe Hughes, which would eventually lead him to entering the junior welterweight World Boxing Super Series tournament. These wins in 2017 would subsequently lead to Yigit being named 'Champion of the Year' by the European Boxing Union for 2017.

=== World Boxing Super Series ===
Anthony Yigit, who was ranked #3 by the IBF, #5 by the WBO and #7 by the WBC at the time, entered the WBSS and was set to face Belarusian junior welterweight Ivan Baranchyk, who was ranked #2 by the IBF and #8 by the WBC. The fight would be for the vacant IBF junior welterweight title as a part of the WBSS quarter finals. Baranchyk would end up being too much for the Swede overwhelming him with relentless pressure, the referee went on to stop the contest at the end of round 7 due to a gruesome injury on Yigit's eye.

=== Yigit vs. Romero ===
After a two-year layoff since his previous fight, Yigit returned to the ring on 17 July 2021 in San Antonio, Texas on the undercard of Jermell Charlo vs. Brian Castaño to face undefeated WBA interim lightweight champion Rolando Romero on short notice after Romero's original opponent pulled out. Romero's title was no longer at stake when Yigit weighed in 5.2 lbs over the 135 lb limit, but the fight nonetheless went ahead. On the night, Romero dropped Yigit multiple times en route to a seventh-round technical knockout victory, handing Yigit his second professional loss.

=== Television ===
In 2021, Yigit appeared as a contestant on Elitstyrkans hemligheter, the Swedish adaptation of SAS: Who Dares Wins on TV4. On 8 April 2023, Yigit was a special guest celebrity in the episode Drömsystrar of the Swedish language reality television series Drag Race Sverige broadcast on SVT1 and SVT Play. In 2024, Yigit competed on the reality-competition series The Challenge Sverige, the Swedish adaptation of The Challenge.

== Professional boxing record ==
34 fights	29 wins	4 losses
By knockout	10	3
By decision	19	1
Draws	1	

No.	Result	Record	Opponent	Type	Round, time	Date	Location	Notes
34	Win	29–4–1	Jamshid Nazari	UD	6	12 Jan 2024	Nalen, Stockholm, Sweden	
33	Win	28–4–1	David Rajuili	UD	6	7 Oct 2023	Arena Naestved, Naevstved, Denmark	
32	Loss	27–4–1	Denys Berinchyk	UD	12	26 Aug 2023	Stadion Wroclaw, Wroclaw, Poland	For WBO International Light lightweight titles
31	Win	27–3–1	Jacob Quinn	UD	4	2023-05-27	Quality Hotel, Malmö, Sweden	
30	Loss	26–3–1	Keyshawn Davis	TKO	9 (10), 0:21	2023-04-08	Prudential Center, Newark, New Jersey, U.S.	For WBO Inter-Continental and vacant WBC-USNBC lightweight titles
29	Win	26–2–1	Humberto Martinez	TKO	3 (8), 2:40	2022-05-22	Santa Marta, Colombia	
28	Win	25–2–1	Ever Garcia Hernandez	KO	2 (8), 2:58	2022-04-24	Club La Armistad, Santa Marta, Colombia	
27	Loss	24–2–1	Rolando Romero	TKO	7 (12), 1:54	2021-07-17	AT&T Center, San Antonio, Texas, U.S.	
26	Win	24–1–1	Siar Ozgul	PTS	8	2019-06-28	York Hall, Bethnal Green, London, England	
25	Win	23–1–1	Sandro Hernandez	TKO	5 (8), 2:30	2019-05-04	Fraport Arena, Frankfurt, Germany	
24	Win	22–1–1	Mohamed Khalladi	UD	8	2019-02-16	Conlog Arena, Koblenz, Germany	
23	Loss	21–1–1	Ivan Baranchyk	RTD	7 (12), 3:00	2018-10-27	Lakefront Arena, New Orleans, Louisiana, U.S.	For vacant IBF light welterweight title; World Boxing Super Series: Super lightweight quarter-final
22	Win	21–0–1	Joe Hughes	UD	12	2017-12-02	Leicester Arena, Leicester, England	Retained EBU (European) light welterweight title
21	Win	20–0–1	Sandor Martin	UD	12	2017-09-30	Solnahallen, Solna, Sweden	Retained EBU (European) light welterweight title
20	Win	19–0–1	Lenny Daws	UD	12	2017-02-11	Westcroft Leisure Centre, Carshalton, England	Won vacant EBU (European) light welterweight title
19	Win	18–0–1	Armando Robles	UD	10	2016-09-10	Hovet, Stockholm, Sweden	
18	Win	17–0–1	Philip Sutcliffe, Jr.	MD	8	2016-05-07	Barclaycard Arena, Hamburg, Germany	
17	Win	16–0–1	DeMarcus Corley	RTD	3 (8), 3:00	2015-12-19	Rosvalla Arena, Nyköping, Sweden	
16	Win	15–0–1	Chaquib Fadli	UD	8	2015-09-19	Rosvalla Arena, Nyköping, Sweden	
15	Win	14–0–1	Tony Owen	TKO	7 (8), 2:08	2015-06-20	Ballerup Super Arena, Ballerup, Denmark	
14	Win	13–0–1	Festim Kryeziu	UD	10	2015-03-21	Rostock, Germany	
13	Win	12–0–1	Kim Poulsen	TKO	6 (10), 0:34	2015-02-07	Arena Nord, Frederikshavn, Denmark	Won vacant WBC Baltic welterweight title
12	Win	11–0–1	Gianluca Ceglia	TKO	7 (8), 0:02	2014-12-13	MusikTeatret, Albertslund, Denmark	
11	Win	10–0–1	Kasper Bruun	TD	6 (10)	2014-04-12	MusikTeatret, Albertslund, Denmark	Won vacant WBC Baltic light welterweight title
10	Win	9–0–1	Ryan Fields	UD	6	2014-02-15	MusikTeatret, Albertslund, Denmark	
9	Win	8–0–1	Radoslav Mitev	TKO	3 (6), 1:55	2014-02-01	Arena Nord, Frederikshavn, Denmark	
8	Win	7–0–1	Michal Vosyka	TKO	6 (6), 0:17	2013-11-23	Stechert Arena, Bamberg, Bayern, Germany	
7	Win	6–0–1	Anton Bekish	UD	6	2013-11-16	MusikTeatret, Albertslund, Denmark	
6	Draw	5–0–1	Tony Pace	MD	4	2013-10-19	Kolding Hallen, Kolding, Denmark	
5	Win	5–0	Andrei Staliarchuk	UD	4	2013-09-07	Arena Nord, Fredrikshavn, Denmark	
4	Win	4–0	Jan Balog	UD	4	2013-06-15	NRGi Arena, Aarhus, Denmark	
3	Win	3–0	Dee Mitchell	PTS	4	25 May 2013	O2 Arena, London, England	
2	Win	2–0	Andrei Hramyka	UD	4	2013-04-27	Alsterdorfer Sporthalle, Hamburg, Germany	
1	Win	1–0	Aliaksandr Abramenka	TKO	3 (4), 2:04	2013-04-13	Arena Nord, Frederikshavn, Denmark	
