= Fight Channel =

Television Network

SK Fight
- Company type: Private
- Industry: Satellite Channel, Cable Channel
- Founded: May 2011
- Founder: Orsat Zovko
- Headquarters: Zagreb, Croatia
- Key people: Orsat Zovko, Chairman/CEO
- Parent: Fight Channel Group
- Website: www.skfight.hr

Fight Channel is a Europe-based international satellite and cable TV channel operating under Fight Channel Group. It is specialised in broadcasting martial arts sports.

In addition to Fight Channel (the basic cable channel), Fight Channel World and Fight Channel PPV, the Fight Channel Group includes one of the most visited martial arts websites in South-East Europe, Fight Site, the martial arts promotion organization Final Fight Championship and several other business entities. The seat of Fight Channel is in Zagreb (Croatia).

Programming covers a wide variety of martial arts events organized by the world's most renowned promotion companies, such as the UFC, K-1, HBO Boxing, Dream, Glory WS, World Series of Boxing etc. Fight Channel stands out for its live coverage of martial arts events. Already in its first season, the channel had close to one hundred live broadcasts, including the UFC, Glory WS, K-1, HBO Boxing, Inoki Genome Federation, Sauerland Boxing, FFC etc. Fight Channel also has a pay-per-view version called Fight Channel PPV. It offers premium contents outside of the standard Fight Channel schedule, usually airing the UFC's and other premium PPV events. In addition to its extensive archive of martial arts events and live broadcasting, Fight Channel also offers documentaries, educational programming and films covering the theme of martial arts.

== History ==
=== Fight Channel ===
Fight Channel started operating on May 28, 2011, after several years of preparations and staff recruitment. Fight Channel PPV was launched first, on the Croatian cable TV platform operating under the Deutsche Telekom Group, MaxTV. The first event the channel aired live was Glory 14, held in Russia’s capital Moscow. The standard cable 0-24 channel was launched on November 1, 2011, on multiple cable systems covering the countries of former Yugoslavia. Presently, Fight Channel broadcasts in Croatia, Slovenia, Serbia, Montenegro, Bosnia and Herzegovina and North Macedonia. Fight Channel PPV is on offer in two Croatian cable systems - MAXtv and Bnet.

=== Fight Channel World ===
In 2013, Fight Channel Group launched the global version of its channel called Fight Channel World. It differs from Fight Channel mostly in terms of programming, and the global version is adapted for wider audience, while Fight Channel focuses on viewers in South-East Europe. Fight Channel World also airs live events organized by the most renowned global martial arts promotion companies, replays of past events, documentaries, educational and scripted programs. Fight Channel World started broadcasting test program in Thailand in June 2013.

== Final Fight Championship ==
In 2012, following the example of the world-famous HBO network and its HBO Boxing series, Fight Channel launched its own martial arts promotion series entitled Final Fight, broadcasting live events and selling and distributing broadcasting rights to TV networks worldwide. The first event was called “Fight Channel presents: Cro Cop Final Fight”, as the world martial arts superstar Mirko “Cro Cop” Filipović fought New Zealand’s Ray Sefo under kickboxing rules in the main event. In 2013, an entire series of Final Fight Championship tournaments kicked off, instantly winning over the European audience and featuring global martial arts stars, including kickboxing fighters Mirko Filipović, Ray Sefo, Pavel Zhuravlev, Hesdy Gerges and MMA stars, such as the former UFC champion Ricco Rodriguez. The FFC (short for “Final Fight Championship”) events have been aired live in close to sixty countries of the world.

== K-1 WGP Final ==
On January 24, 2013, it was revealed that the final tournament of the K-1 WGP series would take place in Zagreb, following the Final 16 tournament held in October 2012. It was a major surprise in the world of martial arts as the K-1 WGP Final had never been held outside Japan before. Heads of the K-1 promotion decided to entrust the Fight Channel Group with the production of the event, basing their decision on the outstanding production and organization of the “Fight Channel Presents: Cro Cop Final Fight” event held in 2012. It was decided that the final event of the prestigious tournament would be officially titled “Fight Channel presents: K-1 WGP Final”.

On March 15, 2013, the K-1 WGP Final was held in Arena Zagreb, in front of approximately 15,500 people. Following wins against Jarrell Miller, Pavel Zhuravlev and Ismael Londt in the final match, Mirko Filipović won the valuable title in front his own crowd. Fight Channel’s production and organization was universally praised by the world public. The president and owner of the K-1 promotion company, Mike Kim, stated after the K-1 WGP Final that it was the best day for the K-1 organization since he had taken control of it.
