= Armen Zakaryan =

Russian boxer

Personal information
- Born: Armenia
- Height: 174 cm (5 ft 9 in)
- Weight: 64 kg (141 lb)

Sport
- Country: Russia
- Sport: Boxing
- Event: Light Welterweight
Medal record
Representing Russia
Eindhoven Box Cup
Gold medal – first place	2016 Eindhoven	Light Welterweight
European Amateur Championships
Gold medal – first place	2013 Minsk	Light Welterweight

Armen Zakaryan (Armenian: Արմեն Զաքարյան, Russian: Армен Закарян) is an Armenian-born Russian amateur boxer.

== Career ==
Zakaryan won gold at the Russian National Boxing Championship in November 2012. He won a gold medal at the 2013 European Amateur Boxing Championships.

On January 31, 2015, he became the AIBA Pro Boxing world champion in his weight category by defeating Artem Harutyunyan, in a closely fought game. Zakaryan won five out of the eight rounds. However, in September 2015, he lost the Championship bout to Artem Harutyunyan, in an even more close game. Harutyunyan was declared the winner by split decision of the judges after 12 rounds of boxing.

In 2016 Artem Zakaryan won a gold medal in the Eindhoven Box Cup 2016 in the Netherlands. In the quarterfinals he won against British Royal Navy boxer Luke Fisher (England) by split decision. The semi-finals he saw a unanimous win over Ben Rees Davies (England). In the final Zakaryan won by KO over Indonesia's Kennedy Pattinama.
