= Mehdi Tolouti =

Iranian boxer

Mehdi Tolouti is an Iranian boxer. At the 2012 Summer Olympics, he competed in the Men's light welterweight, but was defeated in the second round.
