= Merey Akshalov =

Kazakhstani boxer (born 1988)

Personal information
- Nationality: Kazakhstan
- Born: Мерей Төлегенұлы Ақшалов; 8 May 1988 (age 38) Astana, Kazakh SSR, Soviet Union
- Height: 1.79 m (5 ft 10 in)
- Weight: Light welterweight

Boxing career
Medal record
World Championships
Gold medal – first place	2013 Almaty	Light welterweight
Asian Championships
Gold medal – first place	2013 Amman	Light welterweight

Merey Akshalov (Kazakh: Мерей Төлегенұлы Ақшалов; born 8 May 1988) is an amateur boxer from Kazakhstan. He competed at Beijing's 2008 Summer Olympics in the lightweight division. He defeated Hungarian Miklos Varga (12:3), but lost to local Hu Qing (7:11).
