= Nico Elorde =

Filipino basketball player

No. 4 – Abra Weavers
- Position: Point guard
- League: MPBL

Personal information
- Born: October 4, 1991 (age 35) Parañaque City, Philippines
- Listed height: 5 ft 10 in (1.78 m)
- Listed weight: 155 lb (70 kg)

Career information
- High school: De La Salle Zobel (Muntinlupa)
- College: De La Salle (2010); Ateneo (2012–2014)
- PBA draft: 2015: 3rd round, 33rd overall pick
- Drafted by: Alaska Aces
- Playing career: 2015–present

Career history
- 2015–2016: Pacquiao Powervit Pilipinas Aguilas / Pilipinas MX3 Kings
- 2016–2017: Mahindra Enforcer/Floodbuster / Kia Picanto
- 2017–2021: NorthPort Batang Pier
- 2022–2025: GenSan / South Cotabato Warriors
- 2026–present: Abra Weavers

Career highlights
- UAAP champion (2012)

Juan Nicholas V. "Nico" Elorde (born 4 October 1991) is a Filipino professional basketball player for the Abra Weavers of the Maharlika Pilipinas Basketball League (MPBL).

== Early life ==
Nico is third the son of Johnny Elorde, a boxing promoter in the Philippines and the grandson of Gabriel Elorde. His two older brothers Juan Martin Elorde and Juan Miguel Elorde are both professional boxers.

Although their family is well known in the boxing community and he was introduced to boxing by the age of four, instead, Nico chose to play basketball to be different from his brothers' chosen sporting careers.

== College career ==
Elorde attended De La Salle Zobel during his high school days and decided to play for the De La Salle Green Archers. However, Elorde decided to transfer La Salle's archrival Ateneo de Manila University because of lack of playing time in his freshman year and the school's recruitment of more point guards, leading to his getting cut from the team. Elorde had to serve a one-year residency rule of the UAAP and finally suited up for the Blue Eagles in the 2012 season.

== College statistics ==
GP	Games played	GS	Games started	W-L	Games won-Games lost	MPG	Minutes per game
FG%	Field-goal percentage	3P%	3-point field-goal percentage	FT%	Free-throw percentage	OFF	Offensive rebounds per game
DEF	Defensive rebounds per game	RPG	Toltal rebounds per game	APG	Assists per game	SPG	Steals per game
BPG	Blocks per game	TOV	Turnovers per game	PF	Personal fouls per game	PPG	Points per game

=== UAAP ===
College basketball career statistics of Nico Elorde.

†	Denotes seasons in which Elorde won an UAAP Basketball Championship
**Bold**	Denotes career highs

==== Regular season ====
Year	Team	GP	MPG	FG%	3P%	FT%	RPG	APG	SPG	BPG	PPG
2012-13†	Ateneo	14	14.1	**41.9**	**36.4**	62.5	2	1	.1	.1	3.2
2013-14	Ateneo	14	18.2	28.9	30.3	80.9	3.1	2.1	.5	.1	6.6
2014-15	Ateneo	14	**29.8**	29	19.4	**87.2**	**3.9**	**3.7**	**.9**	**.2**	**7.9**
Career		42	20.7	30.8	26.3	79.7	3	2.3	.5	.1	5.9

==== Playoffs ====
Year	Team	GP	MPG	FG%	3P%	FT%	RPG	APG	SPG	BPG	PPG
2014-15	Ateneo	2	32.7	46.2	42.9	83.3	3	4.5	1.5	0	10
Career		2	32.7	46.2	42.9	83.3	3	4.5	1.5	0	10

== Professional career ==
On August 23, 2015, Elorde was drafted by the Alaska Aces with their 33rd pick, however, he was left unsigned by Alaska.

In September 2015, Elorde was reported to be practicing with the Mahindra Enforcers, a team owned and coached by boxing champion Manny Pacquiao, and raised the possibility of an Elorde-Pacquiao back-court tandem, where both names are popular in the sport of boxing with Pacquiao being one of the best boxers at the time, and Elorde, whose grandfather Gabriel was a very popular boxer in the 60s and 70s and was considered one of the best boxers ever. However, that eventually was shelved as Elorde was sent to Mahindra's ABL affiliate Pacquiao Powervit Pilipinas Aguilas (now the Pilipinas MX3 Kings), another team owned by Pacquiao.

In March 2016, after the 2015–16 ABL season ended, Elorde was signed by Mahindra for the 2016 PBA Commissioner's Cup.

== PBA career statistics ==
Legend
GP	Games played	MPG	Minutes per game
FG%	Field-goal percentage	3P%	3-point field-goal percentage	FT%	Free-throw percentage
RPG	Rebounds per game	APG	Assists per game	SPG	Steals per game
BPG	Blocks per game	PPG	Points per game	**Bold**	Career high

As of the end of 2021 season

=== Season-by-season averages ===
Year	Team	GP	MPG	FG%	3P%	FT%	RPG	APG	SPG	BPG	PPG
2015–16	Mahindra	11	8.7	.273	.000	.778	1.4	1.0	.1	.0	1.7
2016–17	Mahindra / Kia	23	15.3	.269	.356	**.833**	1.7	2.3	.9	.0	4.2
2017–18	GlobalPort / NorthPort	34	**22.7**	.306	.231	.733	**3.1**	3.3	**1.1**	.0	5.3
2019	NorthPort	**39**	**22.7**	.328	.267	.794	2.8	**3.7**	.8	.0	**6.0**
2020	NorthPort	11	20.4	**.339**	.250	.722	2.7	2.6	.5	.0	5.3
2021	NorthPort	17	8.9	.333	**.357**	.600	1.5	.9	.1	.0	2.2
Career		135	18.3	.311	.268	.755	2.4	2.7	.7	.0	4.6

== Awards and honors ==
- UAAP Season 75 Men's Basketball Champion

== Personal life ==
Nico married to TV host & sports reporter Mich Del Carmen in 2019 & they have a child..
