= Jonathan Alonso =

Spanish boxer (born 1990)

Personal information
- Nickname: Maravilla
- Nationality: Spanish
- Born: Jonathan Alonso Flete; 6 September 1990 (age 35) Jamao al Norte, Dominican Republic
- Height: 1.75 m (5 ft 9 in)
- Weight: Light welterweight

Boxing career
- Stance: Orthodox

Boxing record
- Total fights: 25
- Wins: 23
- Win by KO: 7
- Losses: 2

Jonathan "Maravilla" Alonso Flete (born 6 September 1990) is a boxer. Born in the Dominican Republic, he represents Spain internationally. At the 2012 Summer Olympics, he competed in the Men's light welterweight, but was defeated in the first round.

In 2024, he was one of the co-stars of the Mexican film V de Víctor.

== Professional boxing record ==
24 fights	22 wins	2 losses
By knockout	7	0
By decision	15	2

No.	Result	Record	Opponent	Type	Round, time	Date	Location	Notes
24	Win	22–2	(Mexico) Jose Angel Rosales Romero	UD	8	2022-10-21	Palacio de los Deportes, Oviedo, Spain	
23	Loss	21–2	(Venezuela) Luis Enrique Romero	PTS	8	2022-03-11	Palacio de los Deportes, Oviedo, Spain	
22	Win	21–1	(Belgium) Mohamed El Marcouchi	UD	8	2021-12-03	Bilbao Arena, Bilbao, Spain	
21	Win	20–1	(Nicaragua) David Bency	UD	6	2021-07-18	Polideportivo Magarinos, Madrid, Spain	
20	Win	19–1	(Venezuela) Samuel Gonzalez	UD	10	2019-12-12	Pabellón de la Vall d'Hebron, Barcelona, Spain	
19	Loss	18–1	(Dominican Republic) Alberto Puello	UD	12	2019-07-27	Coliseo Carlos 'Teo' Cruz, Santo Domingo, Dominican Republic	For interim WBA World super lightweight title
18	Win	18–0	(Spain) Ruben Garcia	TKO	7 (10)	2019-02-15	Palacio de los Deportes, Oviedo, Spain	Retained Spanish super lightweight title
17	Win	17–0	(Spain) Ignacio Mendoza	UD	10	2018-10-01	Nuevo Teatro Alcalá, Madrid, Spain	Won Spanish super lightweight title
16	Win	16–0	(Georgia (country)) Giorgi Gviniashvili	TKO	7 (8)	2018-06-30	Inefc, Barcelona, Spain	
15	Win	15–0	(France) Sylvain Chapelle	UD	8	2018-06-02	Expocoruna, La Coruña, Spain	
14	Win	14–0	(Spain) Rubén Rodríguez	UD	8	2018-03-10	Hotel Novotel Madrid Center, Madrid, Spain	
13	Win	13–0	(Nicaragua) Elvin Perez	KO	1 (8)	2017-12-16	Plaza de Toros La Cubierta, Leganes, Spain	
12	Win	12–0	(Dominican Republic) Brayner Vazquez	UD	8	2017-02-24	(Dominican Republic) Maunoloa Night Club y Casino, Santo Domingo	
11	Win	11–0	(Venezuela) Jherson Perez	UD	8	2016-09-16	(Dominican Republic) Hotel Jaragua, Santo Domingo	
10	Win	10–0	(United States) Brian Jones	UD	6	2016-06-25	(United States) Barclays Center, Brooklyn	
9	Win	9–0	(Georgia (country)) Koba Karkashadze	PTS	6	2016-05-20	Palacio de los Deportes, Gijon, Spain	
8	Win	8–0	(United States) Ricardo Maldonado	UD	6	2016-02-17	(United States) BB King Blues Club & Grill, New York	
7	Win	7–0	(Georgia (country)) Koba Karkashadze	PTS	6	2015-11-06	Palacio de los Deportes, Gijon, Spain	
6	Win	6–0	(Puerto Rico) Ken Alvarez	UD	6	2015-05-30	(United States) Resorts World Casino, Queens	
5	Win	5–0	(United States) Jose L Guzman	RTD	2 (6)	2015-05-08	(United States) Hilton Westchester, Rye Brook	
4	Win	4–0	(Portugal) Andrei Teixeira	KO	1 (4)	2015-03-20	Gijon, Spain	
3	Win	3–0	(El Salvador) Vladimir Cortez	KO	1 (4)	2015-03-06	Pabellón Jorge Garbajosa, Torrejón de Ardoz, Spain	
2	Win	2–0	(Georgia (country)) Nugzar Margvelashvili	PTS	4	2014-11-28	Palacio de los Deportes, Gijon, Spain	
1	Win	1–0	(United States) Jose Gomez	TKO	3 (4)	2014-08-13	(United States) BB King Blues Club & Grill, New York, USA	Professional debut
