= Juan Martin Elorde =

Filipino boxer

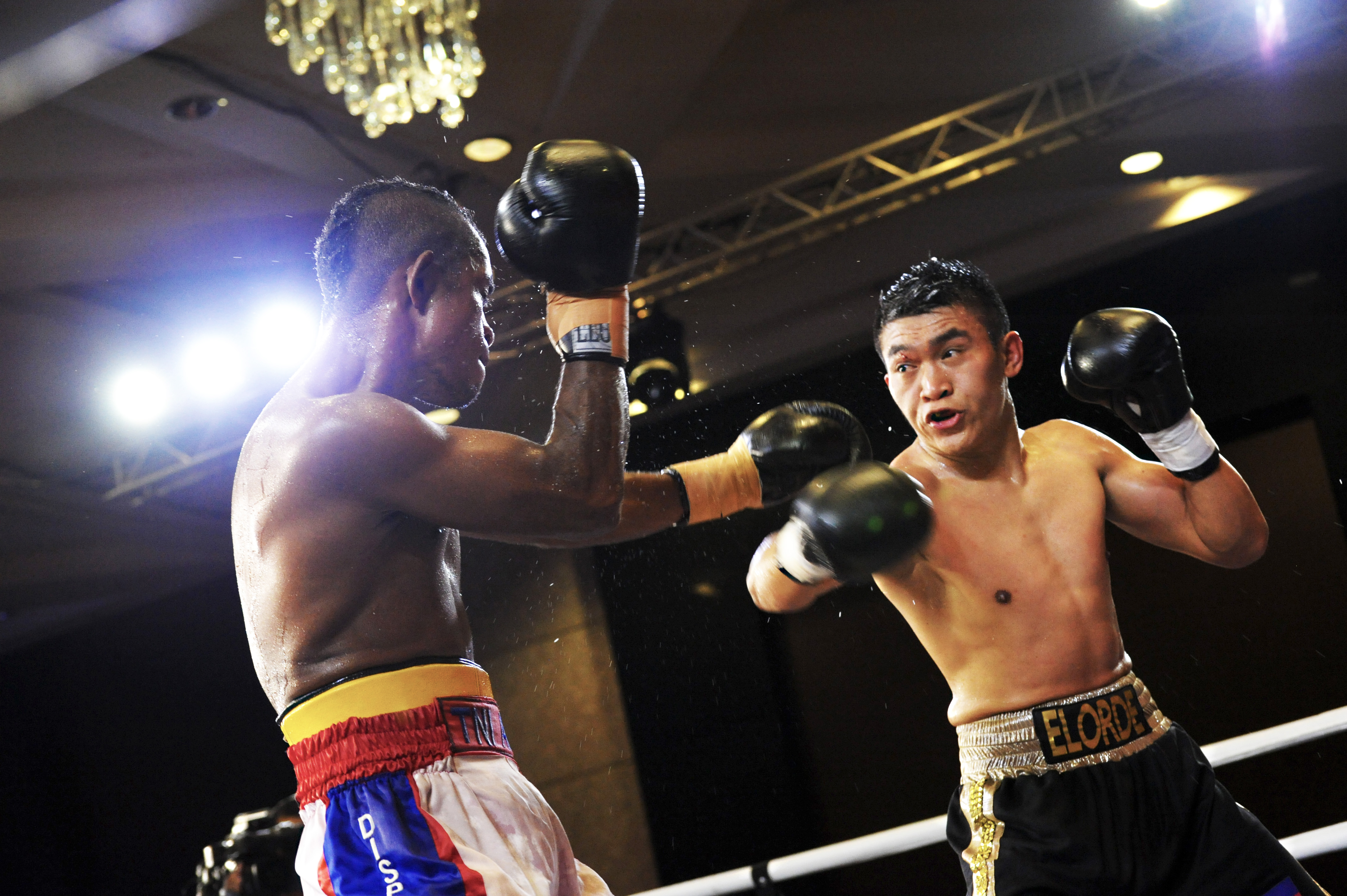
- Bai (28249558526) Elorde (R) in March 2016

Personal information
- Nickname: "Bai"
- Nationality: Filipino
- Born: Juan Martin Vicencio Elorde; 3 November 1984 (age 41) Parañaque, Metro Manila, Philippines
- Height: 170 cm (5 ft 7 in)
- Weight: Lightweight

Boxing career
- Stance: Southpaw

Boxing record
- Total fights: 26
- Wins: 24
- Win by KO: 11
- Losses: 2
- Draws: 1

Juan Martin "Bai" Elorde (born 3 November 1984) is a Filipino boxer. He is a former WBO Asia Pacific featherweight and WBO Oriental lightweight champion. He is managed and promoted by his father Johnny Elorde.

== Early years ==
Juan Martin Elorde is the eldest of the three sons of Johnny Elorde, and the grandson of Gabriel Elorde. His brother Juan Miguel Elorde is also a boxer. The other is Nico Elorde, a professional Basketball player in the Philippines playing in the PBA.

Elorde and his brothers were introduced to boxing by his father as a way to induce discipline. He started fighting in amateur boxing at age 15 and eventually won gold medal in the national open.

== Notable fights ==
Bai defeated Indonesian Musa Letding to win the vacant WBO Oriental Lightweight title via unanimous decision on 25 March 2016. Bai had a tough time closing in on Letding but was able to counter the latter by his stinging jabs. He won 98–92 in all of the judges' score cards. The title is Elorde's second regional title. The previous was the WBO Asia Pacific Super Featherweight title he held from March 2013 to March 2016.

== Professional boxing record ==
27 fights	24 wins	2 losses
By knockout	11	1
By decision	13	1
Draws	1	

No.	Result	Record	Opponent	Type	Round, time	Date	Location	Notes
27	Win	24-2-1	(Indonesia) Rengga Rengga	RTD	2 (6), 3:00	2019-03-25	(Philippines) Okada Manila Hotel and Casino, Parañaque, Metro Manila	
26	Loss	23-2-1	(Russia) Isa Chaniev	TKO	6 (12), 1:52	2017-12-09	Evloev Sports Palaca, Nazran, Russia	For vacant WBO International lightweight title and IBF Inter-Continental lightweight title
25	Win	23-1-1	(Indonesia) Arief Blader	KO	6 (10), 2:18	2017-09-23	(Philippines) The Flash Grand Ballroom, Elorde Sports Complex, Parañaque, Metro Manila	
24	Win	22-1-1	(Thailand) Aekkawee Kaewmanee	RTD	6 (10), 3:00	2017-02-25	(Philippines) The Flash Grand Ballroom, Elorde Sports Complex, Parañaque, Metro Manila	Retained WBO Oriental lightweight title
23	Win	21-1-1	(Indonesia) Boido Simanjuntak	UD	10 (10)	2017-09-24	(Philippines) Cafe Lupe, Barangay Mambugan, Antipolo	
22	Win	20-1-1	(Indonesia) Musa Letding	UD	10 (10)	2016-03-29	(Philippines) Sofitel Philippine Plaza, Pasay, Metro Manila	Won vacant WBO Oriental lightweight title
21	Win	19-1-1	(Indonesia) Master Suro	UD	10 (10)	2015-12-12	(Philippines) The Flash Grand Ballroom, Elorde Sports Complex, Parañaque, Metro Manila	
20	Win	18-1-1	(Indonesia) Yakobus Heluka	TKO	6 (10), 0:38	2015-09-12	(Philippines) The Flash Grand Ballroom, Elorde Sports Complex, Parañaque, Metro Manila	
19	Win	17-1-1	(Japan) Hirotsugu Yamamoto	UD	12 (12)	2015-03-25	(Philippines) Manila Hotel Manila, Metro Manila	Retained WBO Asia Pacific super featherweight title
18	Win	16-1-1	(Indonesia) Juniston Simbolon	TD	6 (10), 2:56	2014-08-22	(Philippines) The Flash Grand Ballroom, Elorde Sports Complex, Parañaque, Metro Manila	Retained WBO Asia Pacific super featherweight title
17	Draw	15-1-1	(Thailand) Chaiyong Chanthahong	TD	2 (10)	2014-02-01	(Philippines) The Flash Grand Ballroom, Elorde Sports Complex, Parañaque, Metro Manila	Referee stopped the fight due to accidental headbutt on Bai Elorde, Retained WBO super featherweight title
16	Win	16-1-0	(Thailand) Rajakru Sor Rungwatana	TKO	2 (10), 1:49	2013-08-10	(Philippines) Sofitel Philippine Plaza, Pasay, Metro Manila	
15	Win	14-1-0	(Thailand) Paiboon Lorkam	UD	10 (10)	2013-03-25	(Philippines) Sofitel Philippine Plaza, Pasay, Metro Manila	Won Vacant WBO Asia Pacific super featherweight Title
14	Win	13-1-0	(Philippines) Gerry Sismundo	TKO	4 (6)	2012-10-20	(Philippines) SM Mall of Asia Arena, Pasay, Metro Manila	
13	Win	12-1-0	(Thailand) Chinarong Or Wongsuri	KO	3 (8)	2011-03-25	(Philippines) Sofitel Philippine Plaza, Pasay, Metro Manila	
12	Loss	11-1-0	(United States) Angel Rodriguez	UD	4 (4)	2010-11-13	Cowboys Stadium, Arlington, Texas, United States	
11	Win	11-0-0	(Thailand) Sahasawat Khaedon	KO	1 (8), 2:24	2010-10-02	(Philippines) Harbor Garden Tent, Sofitel Philippine Plaza, Pasay, Metro Manila	
10	Win	10-0-0	(Thailand) Kan Hamongkol	KO	2 (8), 0:42	2010-03-25	(Philippines) Harbor Garden Tent, Sofitel Philippine Plaza, Pasay, Metro Manila	
9	Win	9-0-0	(Philippines) Jomar Borbon	UD	6 (6)	2008-10-24	(Philippines) The Flash Grand Ballroom, Elorde Sports Complex, Parañaque, Metro Manila	
8	Win	8-0-0	(Philippines) Mark Mariano	UD	6 (6)	2009-07-25	(Philippines) The Flash Grand Ballroom, Elorde Sports Complex, Parañaque, Metro Manila	
7	Win	7-0-0	(Philippines) Romnick Dejano	KO	1 (6), 2:37	2008-09-13	(Philippines) Puerto Princesa Coliseum, Puerto Princesa, Palawan	
6	Win	6-0-0	(Philippines) Cris Dollesin	UD	4 (4)	2007-12-02	(Philippines) Araneta Coliseum, Cubao, Quezon City, Metro Manila	
5	Win	5-0-0	(Philippines) Glen Mondol	MD	4 (4)	2007-11-14	(Philippines) Mall of Asia, Pasay, Metro Manila	
4	Win	4-0-0	(Philippines) Ronnel Esparas	UD	4 (4)	2007-10-06	(Philippines) The Flash Grand Ballroom, Elorde Sports Complex, Parañaque, Metro Manila	
3	Win	3-0-0	(Philippines) Rommel Discalsote	KO	3 (4), 2:46	2007-07-28	(Philippines) The Flash Grand Ballroom, Elorde Sports Complex, Parañaque, Metro Manila	
2	Win	2-0-0	(Philippines) Leo Albao	UD	4 (4)	2007-03-23	(Philippines) The Flash Grand Ballroom, Elorde Sports Complex, Parañaque, Metro Manila	
1	Win	1-0	(Philippines) Joseph Mateo	UD	4 (4)	24 Feb 2007	(Philippines) Cebu City Sports Complex, Cebu City, Cebu	Professional debut.
