= Ray Moylette =

Irish boxer

Personal information
- Nicknames: Sugar Ray; Sting Ray
- Nationality: Irish
- Born: 11 April 1990 (age 36) Islandeady, County Mayo, Ireland
- Weight: Lightweight; Light-welterweight

Boxing career
- Stance: Orthodox

Boxing record
- Total fights: 12
- Wins: 11
- Win by KO: 4
- Losses: 1
Medal record
Men's amateur boxing
Representing Ireland
Youth World Championships
Gold medal – first place	2008 Guadalajara	Lightweight
European Championships
Gold medal – first place	2011 Ankara	Light-welterweight

Raymond Peter Moylette (born 11 April 1990), sometimes spelled Moylett, is an Irish former professional boxer. As an amateur he represented Ireland, winning gold medals at the 2008 Youth World Championships and 2011 European Championships.

== Amateur career ==
=== Irish junior titles ===
Moylette represented the St Anne's Boxing Club in Westport, with whom he has been boxing with since the age of six, and won four national titles ranging from Boy 1 level to the Youth division. In 2007, He won both the Cadet and Youth (Under 19) divisions and also won the Best Boxer of the Championships award in becoming the Youth title holder.

=== Youth World Championships ===
At the Youth World Championships in Guadalajara, Mexico, Moylette won the gold medal in the lightweight (60 kg) division, becoming the first Irish boxer in history to win a gold medal at the Youth World Championships. He recently won the Irish senior championships at light welter-weight, beating Ulster champion Steven Donnelly.

At the Youth Championships, Moylette defeated Fred Evans of Wales and Cuba's Juan Garcia to get to the final where he beat Kazakhstan's Daniyar Yeleussinov to take the title.

=== European Championships ===
Despite having been beaten in the quarter-final of The Irish National Championships, Moylette was sent to the 2011 European Championships in Ankara, Moylette secured at least a silver medal in the light-welterweight division after victory over Hajiliyev Heybatulla of Azerbaijan in the semi-finals on 23 June. On 24 June, he went on to win the gold medal after an 18–10 victory against Tom Stalker.

== Professional career ==
Moylette is trained by Paschal Collins, brother of World Champion, Steve Collins. He made his pro debut in March 2017 at The Grand Connaught Rooms in London, with three more victories that year in Boston, USA.

By June 2017, Moylette would build an unblemished 11–0 record. He then challenged for his first professional title in his home county of Mayo. Moylette would face Mexican Christian Uruzquieta for the World Boxing Council International Silver Lightweight title. He will retire after his last bout on 17 March 2024 at the Theatre Royale in Castlebar, County Mayo.

== Personal life ==
Moylette attended Davitt College in Castlebar for his secondary school education. He married his long-time girlfriend Sharon McGing on 28 December 2017.

== Professional boxing record ==
12 fights	11 wins	1 loss
By knockout	4	0
By decision	7	1

No.	Result	Record	Opponent	Type	Round, time	Date	Location	Notes
12	Loss	11–1	(Mexico) Christian Uruzquieta	SD	10	7 Dec 2018	(Republic of Ireland) Royal Theatre, Castlebar, Ireland	
11	Win	11–0	(Puerto Rico) Daniel Sostre	UD	8	23 Jun 2018	(United States) Bank of New Hampshire Pavilion, Gilford, New Hampshire, U.S.	
10	Win	10–0	(Nicaragua) Jorge Moreno	KO	7 (8), 2:09	26 May 2018	(United Kingdom) Corn Exchange, Ipswich, England	
9	Win	9–0	(United States) Matt Doherty	UD	6	31 Mar 2018	(United States) Marina Bay SportsPlex, Quincy, Massachusetts, U.S.	
8	Win	8–0	(Croatia) Luka Leskovic	PTS	6	28 Oct 2017	(United Kingdom) Holte Suite, Villa Park, Birmingham, England	
7	Win	7–0	(United States) Michael Clark	TKO	2 (6), 2:49	30 Sep 2017	(United States) House of Blues, Boston, Massachusetts, U.S.	
6	Win	6–0	(United States) Donte Bryant	SD	6	15 Sep 2017	(United States) Foxwoods Resort Casino, Ledyard, Connecticut, U.S.	
5	Win	5–0	(Nigeria) Innocent Anyanwu	PTS	6	24 Jun 2017	(Republic of Ireland) National Stadium, Dublin, Ireland	
4	Win	4–0	(United States) Bryan Abraham	RTD	1 (4), 3:00	20 May 2017	(United States) Memorial Hall, Melrose, Massachusetts, U.S.	
3	Win	3–0	(United States) Oscar Diaz	RTD	1 (4), 3:00	13 May 2017	(United States) Plainridge Park Casino, Plainville, Massachusetts, U.S.	
2	Win	2–0	(United States) Matt Probin	UD	4	18 Mar 2017	(United States) House of Blues, Boston, Massachusetts, U.S.	
1	Win	1–0	(Slovakia) Ivan Godor	PTS	4	4 Mar 2017	(United Kingdom) Grand Connaught Rooms, London, England	
