= Roniel Iglesias =

Cuban boxer (born 1988)

Personal information
- Born: Roniel Iglesias Sotolongo; 14 August 1988 (age 38) Pinar del Río, Cuba
- Height: 1.77 m (5 ft 10 in)
- Weight: Super welterweight

Boxing career

Boxing record
- Total fights: 4
- Wins: 4
- Win by KO: 3
- Losses: 0
- Draws: 0
- No contests: 0
Medal record
Men's amateur boxing
Representing Cuba
Olympic Games
| Gold medal – first place | 2012 London | Light welterweight |
| Gold medal – first place | 2020 Tokyo | Welterweight |
| Bronze medal – third place | 2008 Beijing | Light welterweight |
World Championships
| Gold medal – first place | 2009 Milan | Light welterweight |
| Silver medal – second place | 2017 Hamburg | Welterweight |
Pan American Games
| Gold medal – first place | 2011 Guadalajara | Light welterweight |
| Gold medal – first place | 2019 Lima | Welterweight |
| Silver medal – second place | 2015 Toronto | Welterweight |
Pan American Championship
| Gold medal – first place | 2017 Tegucigalpa | Welterweight |
Central American and Caribbean Games
| Gold medal – first place | 2014 Veracruz | Welterweight |
| Gold medal – first place | 2018 Barranquilla | Welterweight |

Roniel Iglesias Sotolongo (born 14 August 1988) is a Cuban boxer, best known for winning the junior world title at lightweight in 2006, a bronze medal at the 2008 Summer Olympics in Beijing and a gold at the 2012 Summer Olympics in London. He went on to add to his already impressive Olympic resume by winning another gold medal at the 2020 Summer Olympics in Tokyo at 33-years-old.

== Career ==
In 2005, Iglesias won the national (senior) flyweight title as a 16-year-old when Olympic champion Yuriorkis Gamboa was out injured. He beat future two-time champ Yoandri Salinas and then Karel Luis in the final. However, the more experienced Andry Laffita who had competed at junior flyweight was sent to the world championships.

In 2006, he competed in January at the national (senior) championships at bantamweight and lost in the semifinal to Idel Torriente, in September he had put on 6 more kilograms and won the 2006 world title at lightweight in Agadir, Morocco. In the quarterfinals he beat Éverton Lopes and then Kazach Azamat Smagulov in the final.

In 2008 he won the junior welter national senior championship, he beat Richard Poll 12:9 in the final and was sent to the Olympic qualifier in Trinidad where he beat another teenager Javier Molina in the semifinal to qualify for the 2008 Summer Olympics where he lost his semi to defending champion Manus Boonjumnong.

In the 2012 Olympic Games in London, Iglesias won the gold medal by defeating Denys Berinchyk from Ukraine by a score of 22–15.

He later moved up to welterweight, which was the weight division he competed in at the 2016 Summer Olympics. In the 2020 Olympic Games in Tokyo, Iglesias won a gold medal by defeating Pat McCormack from Great Britain by a score of 5–0.

== Results ==
Beijing 2008 Olympic results

- Defeated Mahaman Smaila (Cameroon) 15–1
- Defeated Driss Moussaid (Morocco) 15–4
- Defeated Gennady Kovalev (Russia) 5–2
- Lost to Manus Boonjumnong (Thailand) 5–10

London 2012 Olympic results

- Defeated Cesar Villarraga Aldana (Colombia) 20–9
- Defeated Everton Dos Santos Lopes (Brazil) 18–15
- Defeated Uktamjon Rahmonov (Uzbekistan) 21–15
- Defeated Vincenzo Mangiacapre (Italy) 15–8
- Defeated Denys Berinchyk (Ukraine) 22–15

Rio 2016 Olympic results

- Defeated Vladimir Margaryan (Armenia) TKO
- Lost to Shakhram Giyasov (Uzbekistan) 3–0

Tokyo 2020 Olympic results

- Defeated Sewon Okazawa (Japan) 3–2
- Defeated Delante Johnson (USA) 5–0
- Defeated Andrey Zamkovoy (Russia) 5–0
- Defeated Pat McCormack (Great Britain) 5–0
