= Tom Stalker =

English boxer (born 1984)

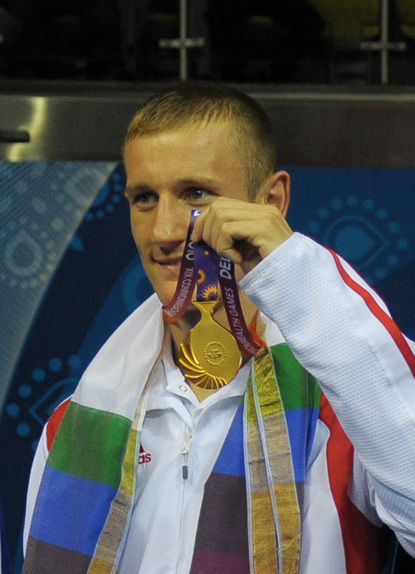

Personal information
- Nickname: El Capitán
- Nationality: English
- Born: Thomas Lee Stalker; 30 June 1984 (age 42) Knowsley, Merseyside, England
- Height: 5 ft 10 in (178 cm)
- Weight: Lightweight; Light-welterweight

Boxing career
- Stance: Southpaw

Boxing record
- Total fights: 18
- Wins: 12
- Win by KO: 2
- Losses: 3
- Draws: 3
Medal record
Men's amateur boxing
Representing England
World Championships
Bronze medal – third place	2011 Baku	Light-welterweight
Commonwealth Games
Gold medal – first place	2010 Delhi	Lightweight
European Championships
Silver medal – second place	2010 Moscow	Lightweight
Silver medal – second place	2011 Ankara	Light-welterweight
EU Championships
Gold medal – first place	2008 Cetniewo	Lightweight
Silver medal – second place	2009 Odense	Lightweight

Thomas Lee Stalker (born 30 June 1984) is an English professional boxer who challenged for the Commonwealth lightweight title in 2017. He won multiple international medals while competing for England as an amateur, including gold at the 2010 Commonwealth Games and bronze at the 2011 World Championships.

== Amateur career ==
As an amateur, Stalker represented Salisbury ABC in Liverpool having previously boxed for St. Aloysius ABC in the Huyton area of Liverpool, he only started boxing at the age of 18, having his first fight when 19. Prior to starting boxing Stalker told Boxing News "I was a bit of a tearaway. I’m not proud of it. I used to rob cars. I was just a young lad, I didn’t know what direction to go in. I wanted to do something with my life, so I went to the local boxing gym that my two brothers were going to, St. Aloysius". At the age of 26 Stalker was voted the amateur boxing of the year by the Boxing Writer's club of Great Britain but claimed that when he started he was anything but a natural saying "My first year I was hopeless but my trainer, Kenny Willis, spent loads of time with me and I soon got better". Domestically Stalker won the 2009 British Amateur Boxing Association (BABA) championships held in Liverpool beating Scotland's Ryan Smith 10:4 in the final. The win came after disappointment the same year as Stalker had previously lost in the final of the ABA Championships to rival Martin Stead by just one point. On 13 November 2010 Stalker competed in the inaugural GB Championships held at the Echo Arena in Liverpool. Initially due to fight Martin Ward in the final, an ankle injury to Ward meant that Josh Taylor, the man Stalker beat in the final of the Commonwealth games stepped in with Stalker narrowly winning in the final moments of the fight. The 2008 Beijing Olympic Games 'warm-up' tournament, 2008 European Union Championships in Poland was the first international tournament which Stalker meddled at, he won the gold medal at the Lightweight division, by beating Hungarian opponent Miklos Varga in the final after losing out at the 2008 European Championships in his home city of Liverpool after he lost 6:4 to Belarusian Vazgen Safaryants in the quarter-final stage. Stalker competed at the 2009 European Union Championships in Denmark a year after winning gold at the same tournament, he once again reached the final of the competition, only to lose 10:4 to German, Eugen Burhard. Of the result Stalker claimed to be disappointed saying "I was a bit gutted as the German who beat me has beaten me before – it was just frustrating as the first round was 0–0, and then I went 2–0 up, but he ended up beating me 10–4." At the 2010 European Championships held in Moscow the Liverpool Lightweight won a silver medal, beating reigning world champion and pre-tournament favourite Domenico Valentino and beat Artjoms Ramlavs of Latvia on count back in the quarter-finals, going on to beat German Eugen Burhard in the semi's, only losing to Russian captain and former world champion Albert Selimov in the final. After the tournament Stalker paid tribute to GB coach Robert McCracken, "You can't hide, he's a great coach. Rob has brought me on a lot." Training with the squad in Sheffield Stalker also credits former WBC Champion Carl Froch, who is also trained at Sheffield with being a great influence saying "Having Carl Froch training and seeing him on the pads and blocking shots, it's great for me". In the same year as his impressive silver medal in Moscow, Stalker captained the Great Britain team to a gold medal at the 2010 Commonwealth Games in Delhi, beating Guyana's Clevon Rock 8:1 in the first round, Sri Lanka's Kamal Sameera 4:0 in the second round, Australia's Luke Jackson 7:2 in the quarter-finals, setting up a semi-final contest again local favourite Jai Bhagwan of India, winning by the score of 10:5. Stalker met Scotland's Josh Taylor in the final, with the English captain running out as a 10:3 winner.

=== 2011 European Amateur Boxing Championships ===
The 2011 European Championships was Stalker's first major tournament since moving up to the 64 kg light welterweight division was held in Ankara, Turkey in which he earned a silver medal, losing to Ireland's Ray Moylette in the final, having beaten previous gold medalist Hrachik Javakhyan of Armenia earlier in the competition.

=== 2011 World Amateur Boxing Championships ===
Stalker won bronze at the 2011 World Championships in Baku, Azerbaijan, losing to the Ukrainian Denys Berinchyk in the semi-final. Earlier in the competition Stalker had defeated Russia's Alexander Solyanikov in a match which sealed his qualification for the 2012 Olympic Games and the Indian Manoj Kumar to seal his semi-final berth and the guarantee of a bronze medal. The qualification to the Olympics came four years after Stalker lost out in the selection process for the 2008 Beijing Olympics. Speaking of the qualification, Stalker said "I only started boxing when I was 19 and I couldn’t throw a punch for a year. Now I’m going to an Olympic Games. It’s crazy. I’ve proved if you dedicate your life to something and believe in yourself, your dreams can come true."

=== 2012 Olympic Games ===
Tom Stalker captained GB Boxing's most successful ever Olympic team at the 2012 London Olympics. Ranked #1 by AIBA's world rankings, he was seeded at the draw and therefore received a bye through to the round of 16. He was due to box the winner of Serdar Hudayberdiyev (Turkmenistan) and Manoj Kumar (India). He met the latter on Saturday 4 August 2012, an opponent who Stalker had already beaten at the 2011 World Amateur Boxing Championships. The pair contested a furious battle and exchanged some damaging blows, but once again, Stalker proveiled by a score of 20:16, thus booking his place in the last 8, within one win of a medal. In the quarter-finals he would meet rank #2, Munkh-Erdene Uranchimeg of Mongolia, they battled in a closely contested bout, however the Mongolian got the better of the bout from the views of the five ringside judges by a score of 23:22, much to the dismay of the 10,000 in attendance at the ExCel Arena. It wasn't the first dubious decision at the Games, as team GB had won several home town decisions already. A heart-broken Stalker revealed on his Twitter account, "Absolutely heartbroken..them judges have Wrecked my life! From the bottom of my heart i won that fight and there's nothin I can do about it." Throughout the Games, Stalker was assisted in his bouts by GB Boxing coach, Paul Walmsley.

== Professional career ==
On 9 January 2012, Stalker signed his first professional contract under Eddie Hearn's Matchroom Sport promotional banner.

Stalker made his professional debut on 23 February 2013 against journeyman Kristian Laight, winning all four rounds to claim a 40–36 victory. His next outing was the next month, his first professional contest in his home city of Liverpool, on Matchroom Boxing's No Retreat No Surrender bill, in which he saw off Andrew Harris via a unanimous points decision. Stalker's latest bout came in similar fashion to those which proceed it, a victory on all judges' scorecards, on this occasion against Hungarian Gyorgy Mizsei Jr in Blackpool's Winter Gardens in April 2013.

== Professional boxing record ==
18 fights	12 wins	3 losses
By knockout	2	1
By decision	10	2
Draws	3	

No.	Result	Record	Opponent	Type	Round, time	Date	Location	Notes
18	Loss	12–3–3	(United Kingdom) Sean Dodd	UD	12	30 Sep 2017	(United Kingdom) Echo Arena, Liverpool, England	For Commonwealth lightweight title
17	Win	12–2–3	(United Kingdom) Chris Adaway	PTS	6	22 Apr 2017	(United Kingdom) Leicester Arena, Leicester, England	
16	Loss	11–2–3	(United Kingdom) Craig Evans	MD	10	26 Nov 2016	(United Kingdom) Motorpoint Arena, Cardiff, Wales	Lost WBO European lightweight title
15	Win	11–1–3	(Portugal) Antonio Joao Bento	PTS	10	4 Jun 2016	(United Kingdom) Echo Arena, Liverpool, England	Won vacant WBO European lightweight title
14	Draw	10–1–3	(United Kingdom) Craig Evans	MD	10	19 Dec 2015	(United Kingdom) Manchester Arena, Manchester, England	For vacant WBO European lightweight title
13	Draw	10–1–2	(United Kingdom) Craig Evans	SD	10	10 Oct 2015	(United Kingdom) Manchester Arena, Manchester, England	For vacant WBO European lightweight title
12	Draw	10–1–1	(United Kingdom) Tommy Carus	PTS	8	11 Jul 2015	(United Kingdom) Manchester Velodrome, Manchester, England	
11	Win	10–1	(United Kingdom) Michael Mooney	PTS	6	6 Mar 2015	(United Kingdom) Echo Arena, Liverpool, England	
10	Loss	9–1	(United Kingdom) Jack Catterall	TKO	8 (12), 2:48	25 Oct 2014	(United Kingdom) Echo Arena, Liverpool, England	For vacant WBO European junior-welterweight title
9	Win	9–0	(United Kingdom) Ben Wager	PTS	6	26 Jul 2014	(United Kingdom) Phones 4u Arena, Manchester, England	
8	Win	8–0	(United Kingdom) Ryan Hardy	PTS	8	10 May 2014	(United Kingdom) Liverpool Olympia, Liverpool, England	
7	Win	7–0	(United Kingdom) Calum Cooper	PTS	8	8 Mar 2014	(United Kingdom) Aintree Equestrian Centre, Liverpool, England	
6	Win	6–0	(United Kingdom) Dan Carr	PTS	6	15 Feb 2014	(United Kingdom) Copper Box Arena, Olympic Park, London, England	
5	Win	5–0	(Hungary) Gyula Vajda	KO	1 (6), 1:53	29 Jun 2013	(United Kingdom) USN Bolton Arena, Bolton, England	
4	Win	4–0	(Romania) Oszkar Fiko	TKO	1 (6), 1:24	7 Jun 2013	(United Kingdom) Liverpool Olympia, Liverpool, England	
3	Win	3–0	(Hungary) Gyorgy Mizsei Jr	PTS	6	20 Apr 2013	(United Kingdom) Winter Gardens, Blackpool, England	
2	Win	2–0	(United Kingdom) Andrew Harris	PTS	4	30 Mar 2013	(United Kingdom) Echo Arena, Liverpool, England	
1	Win	1–0	(United Kingdom) Kristian Laight	PTS	4	23 Feb 2013	(United Kingdom) York Hall, London, England	

== In the media ==
Stalker appeared in the Channel 4 documentary Knockout Scousers in July 2012 alongside Natasha Jonas and James Dickens, which followed him in his bid for Olympic qualification.

Sporting positions
Regional boxing titles
Vacant Title last held by Terry Flanagan	WBO European lightweight champion 4 June 2016 – 26 November 2016	Succeeded by Craig Evans
