= Éverton Lopes =

Brazilian boxer (born 1988)

Personal information
- Full name: Éverton dos Santos Lopes
- Born: August 8, 1988 (age 38) Salvador, Bahia, Brazil

Sport
- Sport: Boxing
Medal record
Men's amateur boxing
Representing Brazil
World Amateur Championships
Gold medal – first place	2011 Baku	Light welterweight
Bronze medal – third place	2013 Almaty	Light welterweight
Pan American Games
Silver medal – second place	2007 Rio de Janeiro	Lightweight
Bronze medal – third place	2011 Guadalajara	Light welterweight
South American Games
Silver medal – second place	2006 Buenos Aires	Lightweight
Silver medal – second place	2010 Medellín	Lightweight

Éverton dos Santos Lopes (born August 8, 1988, in Salvador, Bahia) is a Brazilian professional boxer best known for his sensational 2011 World title win when he was still an amateur. Lopes is also a two-time Olympian, two-time Pan American Games medalist (silver in 2007 and bronze in 2011) and 2013 AIBA World Boxing Championships bronze medalist.

== Career ==
At the 2006 South American Games the 18-year-old Lopes lost the final to Darley Perez. He won the Pan American Junior Championships but lost the quarterfinal at the World Junior Championships 2006 to eventual winner Roniel Iglesias, 24:39. In the final of the 2007 Senior Pan American Games he lost to Cuban world champion Yordenis Ugás.

In 2007, he had two professional MMA fights in Brazil, losing to Alexandre Aranha by Submission and defeating Edmilson Domingos.

He won the 2008 Dominican tournament "Copa Independencia" vs. local Jonathan Batista who had beaten him in the final the year before. At the first Olympic qualifier he lost again to Ugas, at the second he beat fighters like Francisco Vargas to qualify for Beijing. There, fighting at lightweight, he was upset by little-known Asylbek Talasbaev 7:9.

After this he moved up to light welterweight.

At his 2011 World Amateur Boxing Championships win he beat Ukrainian Denys Berinchyk in the final by a score of 26 - 23.

At the 2012 Olympics he ran right into Cuban Roniel Iglesias and lost 15:18.

Lopes has also competed in the sport of MMA, going 1-1.

== Professional boxing record ==
6 Wins (2 knockouts, 4 decisions), 0 Losses, 0 Draws
Res.	Record	Opponent	Type	Rd., Time	Date	Location	Notes
Win	6–0	(Mexico) Eduardo Rafael Reyes	SD	6	2017-09-30	(United States) House of Blues, Boston, Massachusetts	
Win	5–0	(Mexico) Daniel Bastien	KO	2 (4), 1:04	2017-09-01	(United States) Belasco Theater, Los Angeles, California	
Win	4–0	(Mexico) Omar Tienda	MD	8	2015-09-04	(United States) Belasco Theater, Los Angeles, California	
Win	3–0	(Argentina) Marcelo Ezequiel Mesa	UD	6	2015-06-06	(Brazil) Arena Santos, Santos, São Paulo	
Win	2–0	(United States) Robert Alexander Seyam	KO	1 (6), 1:35	2015-04-02	(United States) Belasco Theater, Los Angeles, California	Professional boxing debut at Super Lightweight.
Win	1–0	(United States) Evan Woolsey	UD	6	2015-02-27	(United States) Fantasy Springs Resort Casino, Indio, California	Professional boxing debut at Lightweight.
