= Heybatulla Hajialiyev =

Azerbaijani boxer

Heybatulla Hajialiyev is an Azerbaijani boxer born in 1991. At the 2012 Summer Olympics, he competed in the Men's light welterweight, but was defeated in the first round.
