= 2019 AIBA World Boxing Championships – Light welterweight =

Light welterweight at the 2019 AIBA World Boxing Championships
- Venue: Ekaterinburg Expo
- Location: Yekaterinburg, Russia
- Dates: 12–21 September
- Competitors: 53 from 53 nations

Medalists
| gold medal | Andy Cruz | Cuba |
| silver medal | Keyshawn Davis | United States |
| bronze medal | Manish Kaushik | India |
| bronze medal | Hovhannes Bachkov | Armenia |

The light welterweight competition at the 2019 AIBA World Boxing Championships was held from 12 to 21 September 2019.

== Schedule ==
The schedule was as follows:

| Date | Time | Round |
|---|---|---|
| Thursday 12 September 2019 | 16:15 (Ring A); 16:00 (Ring B) | First round |
| Saturday 14 September 2019 | 19:00 | Second round |
| Tuesday 17 September 2019 | 16:00 | Third round |
| Wednesday 18 September 2019 | 15:30 | Quarterfinals |
| Friday 20 September 2019 | 15:30 | Semifinals |
| Saturday 21 September 2019 | 20:00 | Final |

All times are Yekaterinburg Time (UTC+5)

== Results ==
=== Finals ===
Semi-finals
(Cuba) Andy Cruz | 5
(India) Manish Kaushik | 0
(Armenia) Hovhannes Bachkov | 1
(United States) Keyshawn Davis | 4

Final
(Cuba) Andy Cruz | 5
(United States) Keyshawn Davis | 0

=== Top half ===
==== Section 1 ====
First round
(Finland) Niazz Ahmadi | 2
(Belgium) Ibrahima Diallo | 3
(Wales) Mickey McDonagh | 0
(Canada) Thomas Blumenfeld | 4
(Azerbaijan) Bakhtiyar Gazibajov | 0
(Kazakhstan) Zakir Safiullin | 5
(Democratic Republic of the Congo) Mulumba Mbaya | 4
(Slovakia) Michal Takács | 1
(Moldova) Alexandru Paraschiv | DSQ
(Jordan) Obada Al-Kasbeh

Second round
(Cuba) Andy Cruz | 5
(Belgium) Ibrahima Diallo | 0
(Canada) Thomas Blumenfeld
(Kazakhstan) Zakir Safiullin | w/o
(Australia) Harry Garside | 5
(Democratic Republic of the Congo) Mulumba Mbaya | 0
(Moldova) Alexandru Paraschiv | 0
(Russia) Ilya Popov | 5

Third round
(Cuba) Andy Cruz | 5
(Kazakhstan) Zakir Safiullin | 0
(Australia) Harry Garside | 1
(Russia) Ilya Popov | 4

Quarterfinals
(Cuba) Andy Cruz | 5
(Russia) Ilya Popov | 0

==== Section 2 ====
First round
(Saudi Arabia) Ali Al-Jassas | 0
(Japan) Daisuke Narimatsu | 5
(Israel) Ahmad Shtiwi | 4
(Bulgaria) Kiril Rusinov | 1
(Brazil) Wanderson de Oliveira | 5
(Spain) Adrián Thiam | 0
(Netherlands) Enrico Lacruz | 4
(Poland) Mateusz Polski | 1
(Kyrgyzstan) Argen Kadyrbek Uulu | 0
(India) Manish Kaushik | 5
(Palestine) Ahmed Harara | 0
(China) Shan Jun | 5

Second round
(Georgia (country)) Otar Eranosyan | 0
(Japan) Daisuke Narimatsu | 4
(Israel) Ahmad Shtiwi | 0
(Brazil) Wanderson de Oliveira | 5
(Netherlands) Enrico Lacruz | 0
(India) Manish Kaushik | 5
(China) Shan Jun | 0
(Mongolia) Baatarsükhiin Chinzorig | 5

Third round
(Japan) Daisuke Narimatsu | 2
(Brazil) Wanderson de Oliveira | 3
(India) Manish Kaushik | 5
(Mongolia) Baatarsükhiin Chinzorig | 0

Quarterfinals
(Brazil) Wanderson de Oliveira | 0
(India) Manish Kaushik | 5

=== Bottom half ===
==== Section 3 ====
First round
(Iran) Moslem Maghsoudi | 2
(Thailand) Somchay Wongsuwan | 3
(Colombia) José Viáfara | 5
(Philippines) James Palicte | 0
(Romania) Vasile Suciu | 0
(Hungary) Milán Fodor | 5
(England) Luke McCormack | w/o
(Italy) Francesco Iozia
(Indonesia) Libertus Gha | 0
(Ecuador) Miguel Ferrin | 5

Second round
(Armenia) Hovhannes Bachkov | 4
(Thailand) Somchay Wongsuwan | 1
(Colombia) José Viáfara | 5
(Hungary) Milán Fodor | 0
(Panama) Jonathan Miniel | 0
(England) Luke McCormack | 5
(Ecuador) Miguel Ferrin | 0
(Dominican Republic) Leonel de los Santos | 5

Third round
(Armenia) Hovhannes Bachkov | 5
(Colombia) José Viáfara | 0
(England) Luke McCormack | 2
(Dominican Republic) Leonel de los Santos | 3

Quarterfinals
(Armenia) Hovhannes Bachkov | 5
(Dominican Republic) Leonel de los Santos | 0

==== Section 4 ====
First round
(Algeria) Reda Benbaziz | 0
(Uzbekistan) Elnur Abduraimov | 5
(Republic of Ireland) Wayne Kelly | 2
(Trinidad and Tobago) Michael Alexander | 3
(Germany) Wladislaw Baryshnik | 1
(Turkey) Tuğrul Erdemir | 4
(Ukraine) Oleksandr Zhelezniak | 0
(Tajikistan) Bakhodur Usmonov | 5
(South Korea) Kang Hyeon-bin | 5
(Afghanistan) Ali Ahmadi | 0

Second round
(United States) Keyshawn Davis | 5
(Uzbekistan) Elnur Abduraimov | 0
(Trinidad and Tobago) Michael Alexander | 3
(Czech Republic) Petr Novák | 2
(Turkey) Tuğrul Erdemir
(Tajikistan) Bakhodur Usmonov | RSC
(South Korea) Kang Hyeon-bin | 0
(France) Sofiane Oumiha | 5

Third round
(United States) Keyshawn Davis | 5
(Trinidad and Tobago) Michael Alexander | 0
(Tajikistan) Bakhodur Usmonov | 1
(France) Sofiane Oumiha | 4

Quarterfinals
(United States) Keyshawn Davis | 5
(France) Sofiane Oumiha | 0
