= Andy Cruz =

Cuban boxer and Olympic champion (born 1995)

Personal information
- Born: August 12, 1995 (age 31) Matanzas, Cuba
- Height: 1.75 m (5 ft 9 in)
- Weight: Lightweight

Boxing career
- Stance: Orthodox

Boxing record
- Total fights: 8
- Wins: 7
- Win by KO: 4
- Losses: 1
Medal record
Men's amateur boxing
Representing Cuba
Event	1st	2nd	3rd
Olympic Games	1	0	0
World Championships	3	0	0
Pan American Games	2	0	0
Total	6	0	0
Olympic Games
Gold medal – first place	2020 Tokyo	Lightweight
World Amateur Championships
Gold medal – first place	2017 Hamburg	Light welterweight
Gold medal – first place	2019 Yekaterinburg	Light welterweight
Gold medal – first place	2021 Belgrade	Light welterweight
Pan American Games
Gold medal – first place	2015 Toronto	Bantamweight
Gold medal – first place	2019 Lima	Light welterweight
Central American and Caribbean Games
Gold medal – first place	2018 Barranquilla	Light welterweight
Pan American Championship
Gold medal – first place	2017 Tegucigalpa	Light welterweight
Cuban National Championships
Gold medal – first place	2016 Santiago de Cuba	Light welterweight
Gold medal – first place	2017 Sancti Spiritus	Light welterweight
Gold medal – first place	2018 Camagüey	Light welterweight
Gold medal – first place	2019 Camagüey	Light welterweight

Andy Cruz Gómez (born 12 August 1995) is a Cuban professional boxer. He has won two gold medals at the Pan American Games, three gold medals at the AIBA World Championships, and a gold medal at the 2020 Tokyo Summer Olympics.

== Amateur career ==
Cruz has won multiple gold medals as an amateur including an Olympic medal, two Pan American Games medals, and three medals at the AIBA World Championships. Cruz accumulated over 149 amateur bouts and amassed an amateur record of 140–9 (10 KOs).

=== Amateur losses ===
Cruz accumulated only 9 defeats in his 149 amateur bouts.

- Frank Zaldivar at the 2011 Cuban Schools Championships (22–13)
- Bin Lu at the 2012 AIBA World Youth Championships (16–13)
- Yunier Echevarria at the 2012 Cuban National Championships (DQ)
- Dulat Bekbauov at the 2013 Pavlyukov Youth Memorial (8–8)
- Robeisy Ramírez at the 2014 Cuban National Championships
- Dzmitry Asanau at the 2015 AIBA World Championships (3–0)
- Kevin Hayler Brown at the 2015 Cuban National Championships
- Sofiane Oumiha at the France vs. Cuba Internationals
- Delano James at the World Port Boxing

=== Highlights ===
2015 Toronto Pan American Games (gold)
Event	Round	Result	Opponent	Score
Bantamweight	Quarter-final	Win	Carlos Rocha	3–0
Bantamweight	Semi-final	Win	Kenny Lally	3–0
Bantamweight	Final	Win	Héctor Luis García	3–0
2017 Hamburg AIBA World Championships (gold)
Light welterweight	First round	Win	Sean McComb	5–0
Light welterweight	Quarter-final	Win	Elvis Rodriguez	5–0
Light welterweight	Semi-final	Win	Hovhannes Bachkov	5–0
Light welterweight	Final	Win	Ikboljon Kholdarov	5–0
2019 Lima Pan American Games (gold)
Light welterweight	First round	Win	Wanderson Oliveira	4–1
Light welterweight	Quarter-final	Win	Hendri Cedeno	5–0
Light welterweight	Semi-final	Win	Alston Ryan	5–0
Light welterweight	Final	Win	Keyshawn Davis	4–1
2019 Yekaterinburg AIBA World Championships (gold)
Light welterweight	First round	Win	Ibrahima Diallo	5–0
Light welterweight	Second round	Win	Zakir Safiullin	5–0
Light welterweight	Quarter-final	Win	Ilya Popov	5–0
Light welterweight	Semi-final	Win	Manish Kaushik	5–0
Light welterweight	Final	Win	Keyshawn Davis	5–0
2020 Tokyo Olympic Games (gold)
Lightweight	First round	Win	Luke McCormack	5–0
Lightweight	Quarter-final	Win	Wanderson Oliveira	4–1
Lightweight	Semi-final	Win	Harry Garside	5–0
Lightweight	Final	Win	Keyshawn Davis	4–1
2021 Belgrade AIBA World Championships (gold)
Light welterweight	First round	Win	Jonathan Miniel	5–0
Light welterweight	Second round	Win	Nicollas Rocha de Jesus	5–0
Light welterweight	Third round	Win	Vershaun Lee	5–0
Light welterweight	Quarter-final	Win	Mujibillo Tursunov	3–2
Light welterweight	Semi-final	Win	Hovhannes Bachkov	5–0
Light welterweight	Final	Win	Kerem Özmen	5–0

== Professional career ==
=== Early career ===
Andy Cruz turned professional at the age of 27, signing a deal with Matchroom Boxing. Cruz expressed that in his career as a professional, he will fight no easy opponents and aims to face people who will give him a challenge. On July 15, 2023, Cruz made his professional boxing debut against former two-time world championship challenger Juan Carlos Burgos (35–7–3, 21 KOs) in a 10-round bout at the Masonic Temple in Detroit, Michigan. Cruz won his first minor title in his debut fight by unanimous decision, with the judges scoring the bout 100–90, 100–90, and 98–92.

Cruz was announced to be defending his IBF International lightweight title against Hector Tanajara Jr. (21–1–1, 6 KOs) on December 9, 2023, in a 10-round bout as an undercard fight for Devin Haney vs. Regis Prograis. Shortly after the bout was scheduled, Tanajara Jr. withdrew due to an injury. Later, it was announced that former IBO world lightweight champion Jovanni Straffon (26–5–1, 19 KOs) would fight as a replacement if his visa was approved. After Straffon acquired his visa, the fight was confirmed to continue at the Chase Center in San Francisco, California. Cruz retained his IBF International lightweight title and won the vacant WBA Continental Latin-American lightweight title by knockout after the referee stopped the contest in round three, giving Cruz his first stoppage victory as a professional. According to CompuBox, Cruz outclassed Straffon by landing 88 out of his 146 total punches thrown (60.3%), compared to Straffon's 13 out of 76 punches thrown (17.1%).

In December 2023, Cruz filed a lawsuit against New Champions Promotions for breach of contract and violation of the Ali Act; however, his main promoter, Matchroom Boxing, was mentioned but was not accused of any wrongdoing. Amidst his lawsuit, Cruz was announced to be fighting Brayan Zamarripa (14–2, 5 KOs) for his third professional fight less than twenty-four hours later. The ten-round contest took place as an undercard bout for the main event between Edgar Berlanga and Padraig McCrory on February 24, 2024, at the Caribe Royale in Orlando, Florida. Cruz defended his titles against Zamarripa by unanimous decision, as the judges all scored the fight 100–90 in favour of Cruz. Cruz's promoter, Eddie Hearn, stated during an interview that he is prepared to make a massive offer for Keyshawn Davis as the next opponent for Cruz, or potentially Angel Fierro, if an agreement cannot be reached.

It was announced that Cruz was to be defending his IBF International lightweight title against Antonio Moran (30–6–1, 21 KOs) on the undercard for the title fight between Terence Crawford and Israil Madrimov at BMO Stadium in Los Angeles, California. Cruz defended his titles by knockout after the referee stopped the contest in round seven after Moran lost control of his footing after a sharp right hand. According to CompuBox, Cruz landed 40% of his total punches and landed 45% of his power punches. A few weeks after the fight, Cruz added 2022 BWAA manager of the year winner Peter Kahn to his team in a co-managerial role.

=== Rise up the ranks ===
Cruz was scheduled to defend his IBF International lightweight title against Omar Salcido (20–1, 14 KOs) at the Cosmopolitan of Las Vegas in Paradise, Nevada on January 25, 2025. During the press conference, his promoter, Eddie Hearn, stated that Cruz could use "a couple" more fights before heading for a world title bout. Cruz won by unanimous decision, with the two judges scoring the contest 98–92 and the other judge 99–91 to defend his IBF International lightweight title for the fourth consecutive time. After the fight, Cruz rose to second in the IBF lightweight rankings and is in line for a title eliminator rumoured to be against the sixth ranked, Hironori Mishiro.

Cruz was scheduled to face Hironori Mishiro (17–1, 6 KOs) in an IBF lightweight title eliminator on June 14, 2025, at Madison Square Garden in New York. It was confirmed that this would be Cruz's first time fighting a twelve-round bout in his career. After Vasiliy Lomachenko retired, the interim champion Raymond Muratalla was upgraded to the new IBF lightweight champion, thus changing the opponent for the world champion to whoever wins inside the eliminator. Cruz won the eliminator by fifth-round technical knockout. Prior to the stoppage, Mishiro was knocked down twice in the third round.

=== IBF lightweight title shot ===
==== Cruz vs. Muratalla ====
Cruz rose to the top of the IBF lightweight rankings after his final eliminator. The IBF ordered the bout with Raymond Muratalla for the IBF lightweight title. Negotiations between both camps stalled over money, moving the fight to a purse bid on October 16, 2025. The bid was delayed an extra week before Eddie Hearn's Matchroom Boxing won the bid. It was confirmed that Muratalla is due 65% of the winning bid as the defending titlist, while the remaining 35% would go to Cruz. Cruz is scheduled to fight Raymond Muratalla (23–0, 17 KOs) for the IBF lightweight title on January 24, 2026, in Las Vegas. At the weigh-ins, Muratalla registered a weight of 134.6 pounds, while Cruz weighed in at 134.4 pounds. Despite being the challenger, Cruz was listed as the betting favourite by the bookmakers. Cruz lost the fight, and his unbeaten professional record, by majority decision, with two of the ringside judges scoring the bout 118–110 and 116–112 respectively for Muratalla, while the third had it a 114–114 draw. Despite outlanding Muratalla and being more accurate, Muratalla's activity and pressure won him the fight, particularly during the championship rounds.

==== Cruz vs. Montoya ====
Following a majority decision defeat to Muratalla, the IBF ordered a lightweight eliminator between Albert Bell (28–0, 9 KOs) and Lucas Bahdi (20–0, 15 KOs) in February 2026. After Bahdi declined the bout, the IBF extended the invitation to Cruz, who accepted. On 27 May 2026, Matchroom Boxing won the purse bid with an offer of $298,000. The bout was targeted for July 2026 with the winner becoming mandatory challenger for Muratalla's IBF lightweight title. The fight was later confirmed for July 18, 2026, at the Dignity Health Sports Park in Carson, California. However, on 24 June 2026, the fight was cancelled after Bell withdrew to serve as a late-replacement challenger for Abdullah Mason's world title following Joe Cordina's visa issues. Cruz was rescheduled to co-headline for July against Abraham Montoya (24–7–1, 14 KOs). Cruz returned to the ring after his defeat in January with a third round technical knockout against Montoya, after which Cruz was reportedly dropping back down to 130 pounds.

==== Cruz vs. Subkhankulov ====
Following Raymond Muratalla vacating the IBF lightweight title, the IBF ordered Cruz to face undefeated Artur Subkhankulov (12–0, 6 KOs) for the vacant world title. The bout was scheduled for 27 November 2026 at the Wrestling Palace in Ufa, Russia.

== Professional boxing record ==
8 fights	7 wins	1 loss
By knockout	4	0
By decision	3	1

No.	Result	Record	Opponent	Type	Round, time	Date	Location	Notes
8	Win	7–1	Abraham Montoya	TKO	3 (10), 0:54	Jul 18, 2026	Dignity Health Sports Park, Carson, California, U.S.	
7	Loss	6–1	Raymond Muratalla	MD	12	Jan 24, 2026	Fontainebleau Las Vegas, Las Vegas, Nevada, U.S.	For IBF lightweight title
6	Win	6–0	Hironori Mishiro	TKO	5 (12), 1:13	Jun 14, 2025	Madison Square Garden Theater, New York City, New York, U.S.	
5	Win	5–0	Omar Salcido	UD	10	Jan 25, 2025	Cosmopolitan of Las Vegas, Paradise, Nevada, U.S.	Retained IBF International and WBA Continental Latin-American lightweight titles
4	Win	4–0	Antonio Moran	KO	7 (10), 2:59	Aug 3, 2024	BMO Stadium, Los Angeles, California, U.S.	Retained IBF International and WBA Continental Latin-American lightweight titles
3	Win	3–0	Brayan Zamarripa	UD	10	Feb 24, 2024	Caribe Royale, Orlando, Florida, U.S.	Retained IBF International and WBA Continental Latin-American lightweight titles
2	Win	2–0	Jovanni Straffon	KO	3 (10), 0:53	Dec 9, 2023	Chase Center, San Francisco, California, U.S.	Retained IBF International lightweight title; Won vacant WBA Continental Latin-American lightweight title
1	Win	1–0	Juan Carlos Burgos	UD	10	Jul 15, 2023	Masonic Temple, Detroit, Michigan, U.S.	Won vacant IBF International lightweight title
