= Cuba at the 2020 Summer Olympics =

- IOC code: CUB
- NOC: Cuban Olympic Committee

in Tokyo, Japan July 23, 2021 – August 8, 2021
- Competitors: 70 in 16 sports
- Flag bearers (opening): Yaime Pérez; Mijaín López
- Flag bearer (closing): Zurian Hechavarria
- Medals Ranked 14th: Gold 7 Silver 3 Bronze 5 Total 15

Summer Olympics appearances (overview)
- 1900; 1904; 1908–1920; 1924; 1928; 1932–1936; 1948; 1952; 1956; 1960; 1964; 1968; 1972; 1976; 1980; 1984–1988; 1992; 1996; 2000; 2004; 2008; 2012; 2016; 2020; 2024

Cuba competed at the 2020 Summer Olympics in Tokyo. Originally scheduled to take place from 24 July to 9 August 2020, the Games were postponed to 23 July to 8 August 2021, because of the COVID-19 pandemic. The Cuban delegation was their smallest (and first with fewer than 100 athletes) since 1964, which coincidentally was also in Tokyo. It was the nation's twenty-first appearance at the Summer Olympics. Cuba improved on its 2016 result, by winning 7 gold and 15 total medals after 5 and 11 in Rio.

== Medalists ==
Medal	Name	Sport	Event	Date
Gold	Luis Orta	Wrestling	Men's Greco-Roman 60 kg	2 August
Gold	Mijaín López	Wrestling	Men's Greco-Roman 130 kg	2 August
Gold	Fernando Jorge; Serguey Torres	Canoeing	Men's C-2 1000 metres	3 August
Gold	Roniel Iglesias	Boxing	Men's welterweight	3 August
Gold	Arlen López	Boxing	Men's light heavyweight	4 August
Gold	Julio César La Cruz	Boxing	Men's heavyweight	6 August
Gold	Andy Cruz	Boxing	Men's lightweight	8 August
Silver	Idalys Ortiz	Judo	Women's +78 kg	30 July
Silver	Juan Miguel Echevarría	Athletics	Men's long jump	2 August
Silver	Leuris Pupo	Shooting	Men's 25 metre rapid fire pistol	2 August
Bronze	Rafael Alba	Taekwondo	Men's +80 kg	27 July
Bronze	Maykel Massó	Athletics	Men's long jump	2 August
Bronze	Yaime Pérez	Athletics	Women's discus throw	2 August
Bronze	Lázaro Álvarez	Boxing	Men's featherweight	2 August
Bronze	Reineris Salas	Wrestling	Men's freestyle 97 kg	7 August

Medals by sport
Sport	1st place, gold medalist(s)	2nd place, silver medalist(s)	3rd place, bronze medalist(s)	Total
Athletics	0	1	2	3
Boxing	4	0	1	5
Canoeing	1	0	0	1
Judo	0	1	0	1
Shooting	0	1	0	1
Taekwondo	0	0	1	1
Wrestling	2	0	1	3
Total	7	3	5	15

== Competitors ==
The following is the list of number of competitors participating in the Games:

Sport	Men	Women	Total
Athletics	7	13	20
Boxing	7	0	7
Canoeing	2	2	4
Cycling	0	1	1
Gymnastics	0	1	1
Judo	3	3	6
Modern pentathlon	1	1	2
Rowing	0	1	1
Shooting	3	2	5
Swimming	1	1	2
Table tennis	1	1	2
Taekwondo	1	0	1
Volleyball	0	2	2
Weightlifting	1	3	4
Wrestling	9	3	12
Total	36	34	70

== Athletics ==
Cuban athletes further achieved the entry standards, either by qualifying time or by world ranking, in the following track and field events (up to a maximum of 3 athletes in each event):

Key

- Note–Ranks given for track events are within the athlete's heat only
- Q = Qualified for the next round
- q = Qualified for the next round as a fastest loser or, in field events, by position without achieving the qualifying target
- NR = National record
- N/A = Round not applicable for the event
- Bye = Athlete not required to compete in round

Track & road events

Athlete	Event	Heat		Semifinal		Final	
Athlete	Event	Time	Rank	Time	Rank	Time	Rank
Roxana Gómez	Women's 400 m	50.76 =PB	2 Q	49.71 PB	3 q	DNF	
Rose Mary Almanza	Women's 800 m	2:00.71	1 Q	1:59.65	4	Did not advance	
Zurian Hechavarría	Women's 400 m hurdles	54.99 PB	6 q	55.21	4	Did not advance	
Rose Mary Almanza; Sahily Diago; Zurian Hechavarría; Lisneidy Veitía	Women's 4 × 400 m relay	3:24.04 SB	2 Q	—N/a		3:26.92	8

Field events
Men

Athlete	Event	Qualification		Final	
Athlete	Event	Distance	Position	Distance	Position
Juan Miguel Echevarría	Long jump	8.50 SB	1 Q	8.41 (Note: Echevarría tied for gold with Greece's Miltiadis Tentoglou, but was awarded a silver in the tie-breaker (second best jump).)	2nd place, silver medalist(s)
Lester Lescay	Long jump	7.69	25	Did not advance	
Maykel Massó	Long jump	8.07	7 Q	8.21	3rd place, bronze medalist(s)
Andy Díaz	Triple jump	DNS		Did not advance	
Cristian Nápoles	Triple jump	17.08 SB	4 Q	16.63	10
Luis Zayas	High jump	2.17	=26	Did not advance	

Women

Athlete	Event	Qualification		Final	
Athlete	Event	Distance	Position	Distance	Position
Leyanis Pérez	Triple jump	DNS		Did not advance	
Liadagmis Povea	Triple jump	14.50	5 Q	14.70	5
Davisleydi Velazco	Triple jump	14.14	15	Did not advance	
Yarisley Silva	Pole vault	4.55	=8 Q	4.50	=8
Denia Caballero	Discus throw	57.96	23	Did not advance	
Yaime Pérez	Discus throw	63.18	7 q	65.72	3rd place, bronze medalist(s)

Combined events – Women's heptathlon

Athlete	Event	100H	HJ	SP	200 m	LJ	JT	800 m	Total	Rank
Yorgelis Rodríguez	Result	DNF	DNS	—	—	—	—	—	DNF	
Yorgelis Rodríguez	Points	0	0	—	—	—	—	—	DNF	

== Boxing ==
Cuba entered seven male boxers to compete in each of the following weight classes into the Olympic tournament. With the cancellation of the 2021 Pan American Qualification Tournament in Buenos Aires, all of them, led by Rio 2016 gold medalists Arlen López (men's light heavyweight) and Julio César La Cruz (men's heavyweight), finished among the top five of their respective weight divisions to secure their places on the Cuban squad based on the IOC's Boxing Task Force Rankings for the Americas.

Athlete	Event	Round of 32	Round of 16	Quarterfinals	Semifinals	Final	
Athlete	Event	Opposition Result	Opposition Result	Opposition Result	Opposition Result	Opposition Result	Rank
Yosvany Veitía	Men's flyweight	Bye	Tetteh (GHA); W 5–0	Yafai (GBR); L 1–4	Did not advance		
Lázaro Álvarez	Men's featherweight	Bye	Shahbakhsh (IRI); W RSC-I	Butdee (THA); W 3–2	Batyrgaziev (ROC); L 2–3	Did not advance	3rd place, bronze medalist(s)
Andy Cruz	Men's lightweight	Bye	L McCormack (GBR); W 5–0	Oliveira (BRA); W 4–1	Garside (AUS); W 5–0	Davis (USA); W 4–1	1st place, gold medalist(s)
Roniel Iglesias	Men's welterweight	Bye	Okazawa (JPN); W 3–2	Johnson (USA); W 5–0	Zamkovoy (ROC); W 5–0	P McCormack (GBR); W 5–0	1st place, gold medalist(s)
Arlen López	Men's light heavyweight	Bye	Houmri (ALG); W 5–0	Romero (MEX); W 5–0	Alfonso (AZE); W 5–0	Whittaker (GBR); W 4–1	1st place, gold medalist(s)
Julio César La Cruz	Men's heavyweight	Bye	Ochola (KEN); W 5–0	Reyes (ESP); W 4–1	Teixeira (BRA); W 4–1	Gadzhimagomedov (ROC); W 5–0	1st place, gold medalist(s)
Dainier Peró	Men's super heavyweight	Bye	Salcedo (COL); W 5–0	Torrez (USA); L 1–4	Did not advance		

== Canoeing ==
=== Sprint ===
Cuban canoeists qualified two boats in each of the following distances for the Games through the 2019 ICF Canoe Sprint World Championships in Szeged, Hungary. With the cancellation of the 2021 Pan American Championships, Cuba accepted the invitation from the International Canoe Federation to send a canoeist in the men's C-1 1000 m to the Games.

Athlete	Event	Heats		Quarterfinals		Semifinals		Final	
Athlete	Event	Time	Rank	Time	Rank	Time	Rank	Time	Rank
Fernando Jorge	Men's C-1 1000 m	4:04.378	1 SF	Bye		4:04.725	4 FA	4:13.918	7
José Ramón Pelier	Men's C-1 1000 m	4:06.343	2 SF	Bye		4:09.696	6 FB	4:02.915	9
Fernando Jorge; Serguey Torres	Men's C-2 1000 m	3:39.028	2 SF	Bye		3:27.102	2 FA	3:24.995	1st place, gold medalist(s)
Yarisleidis Cirilo	Women's C-1 200 m	47.267	2 SF	Bye		48.375	6 FB	48.582	12
Katherin Nuevo	Women's C-1 200 m	46.533	2 SF	Bye		49.242	8 FB	49.024	16
Yarisleidis Cirilo; Katherin Nuevo	Women's C-2 500 m	2:03.229	3 QF	2:03.282	1 SF	2:03.655	2 FA	2:01.623	6

Qualification Legend: FA = Qualify to final (medal); FB = Qualify to final B (non-medal)

== Cycling ==
=== Road ===
Cuba entered one rider to compete in the women's Olympic road race, by virtue of her top 22 national finish (for women) in the UCI World Ranking.

Athlete	Event	Time	Rank
Arlenis Sierra	Women's road race	3:59:47	34

== Gymnastics ==
=== Artistic ===
Cuba entered one artistic gymnast into the Olympic competition. Rio 2016 Olympian Marcia Videaux finished among the top twenty eligible for qualification in the women's individual all-around and apparatus events, respectively, to book her spot on the Cuban roster at the 2019 World Championships in Stuttgart, Germany.

Women

Athlete	Event	Qualification						Final					
Athlete	Event	Apparatus				Total	Rank	Apparatus				Total	Rank
Athlete	Event	V	UB	BB	F	Total	Rank	V	UB	BB	F	Total	Rank
Marcia Videaux	Vault	13.499	—N/a			13.499	16	Did not advance					

== Judo ==
Cuba qualified six judoka (three per gender) for each of the following weight classes at the Games. Five of them, with three-time medalist Idalys Ortiz (women's heavyweight, +78 kg) leading the squad at her fourth straight Olympics, were selected among the top 18 judoka of their respective weight classes based on the IJF World Ranking List of June 28, 2021. Meanwhile, Rio 2016 Olympian Magdiel Estrada accepted a continental berth from the Americas as the nation's top-ranked judoka outside of direct qualifying position.

Athlete	Event	Round of 64	Round of 32	Round of 16	Quarterfinals	Semifinals	Repechage	Final / BM	
Athlete	Event	Opposition Result	Opposition Result	Opposition Result	Opposition Result	Opposition Result	Opposition Result	Opposition Result	Rank
Magdiel Estrada	Men's −73 kg	Bye	Sterpu (MDA); L 00–10	Did not advance					
Iván Felipe Silva	Men's −90 kg	Bye	Žgank (TUR); L 00–01	Did not advance					
Andy Granda	Men's +100 kg	—N/a	Rakhimov (TJK); L 00–01	Did not advance					
Maylín del Toro	Women's –63 kg	—N/a	Dahouk (EOR); W 10–00	Barrios (VEN); L 00–10	Did not advance				
Kaliema Antomarchi	Women's –78 kg	—N/a	Bye	Prodan (CRO); W 01–00	Malonga (FRA); L 01–11	Did not advance	Steenhuis (NED); W 10–00	Wagner (GER); L 00–01	5
Idalys Ortiz	Women's +78 kg	—N/a	Bye	Nunes (POR); W 01–00	Xu Sy (CHN); W 10–00	Dicko (FRA); W 11–00	Bye	Sone (JPN); L 00–10	2nd place, silver medalist(s)

== Modern pentathlon ==
Cuban athletes qualified for the following spots to compete in modern pentathlon. Lester Ders and Rio 2016 Olympian Leydi Moya secured a selection each in the men's and women's event respectively by virtue of their top-five finish at the 2019 Pan American Games in Lima.

Athlete	Event	Fencing (épée one touch)				Swimming (200 m freestyle)			Riding (show jumping)			Combined: shooting/running (10 m air pistol)/(3200 m)			Total points	Final rank
Athlete	Event	RR	BR	Rank	MP points	Time	Rank	MP points	Penalties	Rank	MP points	Time	Rank	MP points	Total points	Final rank
Lester Ders	Men's	10–25	0	34	160	2:01.45	15	308	EL	33	0	11:46.41	28	594	1062	36
Leydi Moya	Women's	15–20	1	26	191	2:17.96	29	275	9	15	291	13:16.65	30	504	1261	26

== Rowing ==
Cuba qualified one boat in the women's single sculls for the Games by finishing fourth in the A-final and securing the fourth of five berths available at the 2021 FISA Americas Olympic Qualification Regatta in Rio de Janeiro, Brazil.

Athlete	Event	Heats		Repechage		Quarterfinals		Semifinals		Final	
Athlete	Event	Time	Rank	Time	Rank	Time	Rank	Time	Rank	Time	Rank
Milena Venega	Women's single sculls	8:03.00	4 R	8:17.30	1 QF	8:25.26	5 SC/D	7:41.18	3 FC	7:47.40	17

Qualification Legend: FA=Final A (medal); FB=Final B (non-medal); FC=Final C (non-medal); FD=Final D (non-medal); FE=Final E (non-medal); FF=Final F (non-medal); SA/B=Semifinals A/B; SC/D=Semifinals C/D; SE/F=Semifinals E/F; QF=Quarterfinals; R=Repechage

== Shooting ==
Cuban shooters achieved quota places for the following events by virtue of their best finishes at the 2018 ISSF World Championships, the 2019 ISSF World Cup series, the 2019 Pan American Games, and Championships of the Americas, as long as they obtained a minimum qualifying score (MQS) by May 31, 2020.

Athlete	Event	Qualification		Semifinal		Final	
Athlete	Event	Points	Rank	Points	Rank	Points	Rank
Jorge Álvarez	Men's 25 m rapid fire pistol	578	12	—N/a		Did not advance	
Jorge Grau	Men's 10 m air pistol	574	19	—N/a		Did not advance	
Leuris Pupo	Men's 25 m rapid fire pistol	583	5 Q	—N/a		29	2nd place, silver medalist(s)
Eglis Yaima Cruz	Women's 10 m air rifle	620.5	37	—N/a		Did not advance	
Eglis Yaima Cruz	Women's 50 m rifle 3 positions	1163	23	—N/a		Did not advance	
Laina Pérez	Women's 10 m air pistol	567	32	—N/a		Did not advance	
Laina Pérez	Women's 25 m pistol	582	14	—N/a		Did not advance	
Jorge Grau; Laina Pérez	10 m air pistol team	568	14	Did not advance			

== Swimming ==
Cuba received a universality invitation from FINA to send two top-ranked swimmers (one per gender) in their respective individual events to the Olympics, based on the FINA Points System of June 28, 2021.

Athlete	Event	Heat		Semifinal		Final	
Athlete	Event	Time	Rank	Time	Rank	Time	Rank
Luis Vega Torres	Men's 200 m butterfly	1:59.00	31	Did not advance			
Luis Vega Torres	Men's 400 m individual medley	4:27.65	29	—N/a		Did not advance	
Elisbet Gámez	Women's 200 m freestyle	2:00.56	23	Did not advance			

== Table tennis ==
Cuba entered two athletes into the table tennis competition at the Games. Daniela Fonseca scored a second-stage final triumph to notch the last ticket available in the women's singles and then teamed up with her partner and Rio 2016 Olympian Jorge Campos to seal an outright victory and a mixed doubles berth at the 2021 Latin American Qualification Tournament in Rosario, Argentina.

Athlete	Event	Preliminary	Round 1	Round 2	Round 3	Round of 16	Quarterfinals	Semifinals	Final / BM	
Athlete	Event	Opposition Result	Opposition Result	Opposition Result	Opposition Result	Opposition Result	Opposition Result	Opposition Result	Opposition Result	Rank
Daniela Fonseca	Women's singles	Lay (AUS); L 0–4	Did not advance							
Jorge Campos; Daniela Fonseca	Mixed doubles	—N/a				Franziska / Solja (GER); L 0–4	Did not advance			

== Taekwondo ==
Cuba entered one athlete into the taekwondo competition at the Games. Rio 2016 Olympian and double world champion Rafael Alba secured a spot in the men's heavyweight category (+80 kg) with a top two finish at the 2020 Pan American Qualification Tournament in San José, Costa Rica.

Athlete	Event	Round of 16	Quarterfinals	Semifinals	Repechage	Final / BM	
Athlete	Event	Opposition Result	Opposition Result	Opposition Result	Opposition Result	Opposition Result	Rank
Rafael Alba	Men's +80 kg	Georgievski (MKD); L 8–11	Did not advance		Gbané (CIV); W 8–2	Sun Hy (CHN); W 5–4	3rd place, bronze medalist(s)

== Volleyball ==
=== Beach ===
Cuba women's beach volleyball team qualified for the Olympics by winning the gold medal at the 2018–2020 NORCECA Continental Cup Final in Colima, Mexico.

Athlete	Event	Preliminary round				Repechage	Round of 16	Quarterfinals	Semifinals	Final / BM	
Athlete	Event	Opposition Score	Opposition Score	Opposition Score	Rank	Opposition Score	Opposition Score	Opposition Score	Opposition Score	Opposition Score	Rank
Lidy Echevarría; Leila Martínez	Women's	Artacho / Clancy (AUS); L (15–21, 14–21)	Kholomina / Makroguzova (ROC); L (16–21, 11–21)	Menegatti / Orsi Toth (ITA); W (21–16, 21–16)	3 R	Schoon / Stam (NED); W (21–17, 21–17)	Klineman / Ross (USA); L (17–21, 15–21)	Did not advance			

== Weightlifting ==
Cuba entered four weightlifters (one man and three women) into the Olympic competition. Rio 2016 Olympian Marina Rodríguez finished seventh of the eight highest-ranked weightlifters in the women's 64 kg category based on the IWF Absolute World Rankings, with rookies Olfides Sáez (men's 96 kg), Ludia Montero (women's 49 kg), and Eyurkenia Pileta (women's +87 kg) topping the field of weightlifters vying for qualification from the Americas in their respective weight categories based on the IWF Absolute Continental Rankings.

Athlete	Event	Snatch		Clean & Jerk		Total	Rank
Athlete	Event	Result	Rank	Result	Rank	Total	Rank
Olfides Sáez	Men's –96 kg	156	11	203	7	359	9
Ludia Montero	Women's –49 kg	82	5	96	7	178	6
Marina Rodríguez	Women's –64 kg	98	11	123	6	221	8
Eyurkenia Pileta	Women's +87 kg	96	10	129	8	225	9

== Wrestling ==
Cuba qualified twelve wrestlers for each of the following classes into the Olympic competition. Two of them finished among the top six to book Olympic spots in the men's Greco-Roman (67 and 130 kg) at the 2019 World Championships, while ten more licenses were awarded to Cuban wrestlers, who progressed to the top two finals at the 2020 Pan American Qualification Tournament in Ottawa, Canada.

Key:

- VT (ranking points: 5–0 or 0–5) – Victory by fall.
- VB (ranking points: 5–0 or 0–5) – Victory by injury (VF for forfeit, VA for withdrawal or disqualification)
- PP (ranking points: 3–1 or 1–3) – Decision by points – the loser with technical points.
- PO (ranking points: 3–0 or 0–3) – Decision by points – the loser without technical points.
- ST (ranking points: 4–0 or 0–4) – Great superiority – the loser without technical points and a margin of victory of at least 8 (Greco-Roman) or 10 (freestyle) points.
- SP (ranking points: 4–1 or 1–4) – Technical superiority – the loser with technical points and a margin of victory of at least 8 (Greco-Roman) or 10 (freestyle) points.

Freestyle

Athlete	Event	Round of 16	Quarterfinal	Semifinal	Repechage	Final / BM	
Athlete	Event	Opposition Result	Opposition Result	Opposition Result	Opposition Result	Opposition Result	Rank
Alejandro Valdés	Men's −65 kg	Niyazbekov (KAZ); L 1–3 ^{PP}	Did not advance				11
Geandry Garzón	Men's −74 kg	Kadzimahamedau (BLR); L 1–3 ^{PP}	Did not advance		Dake (USA); L 0–4 ^{ST}	Did not advance	9
Reineris Salas	Men's −97 kg	Hushtyn (BLR); W 3–1 ^{PP}	Nurov (MKD); W 3–1 ^{PP}	Sadulaev (ROC); L 0–3 ^{PO}	Bye	Sharifov (AZE); W 3–1 ^{PP}	3rd place, bronze medalist(s)
Yusneylys Guzmán	Women's −50 kg	Sun Yn (CHN); L 1–3 ^{PP}	Did not advance		Livach (UKR); L 0–5 ^{VT}	Did not advance	12
Laura Hérin	Women's −53 kg	Pang Qy (CHN); L 1–3 ^{PP}	Did not advance		Winchester (USA); L 0–3 ^{PP}	Did not advance	15
Yudaris Sánchez	Women's −68 kg	Zhou F (CHN); L 1–3 ^{PP}	Did not advance				12

Greco-Roman

Athlete	Event	Round of 16	Quarterfinal	Semifinal	Repechage	Final / BM	
Athlete	Event	Opposition Result	Opposition Result	Opposition Result	Opposition Result	Opposition Result	Rank
Luis Orta	Men's −60 kg	Hafizov (USA); W 3–0 ^{PO}	Emelin (ROC); W 3–1 ^{PP}	Ciobanu (MDA); W 4–0 ^{ST}	Bye	Fumita (JPN); W 3–1 ^{PP}	1st place, gold medalist(s)
Ismael Borrero	Men's −67 kg	Zoidze (GEO); L 1–3 ^{PP}	Did not advance				11
Yosvanys Peña	Men's −77 kg	Ali Geraei (IRI); L 1–3 ^{PP}	Did not advance				10
Daniel Grégorich	Men's −87 kg	Abbasov (AZE); W 3–1 ^{PP}	Metwally (EGY); L 0–5 ^{VT}	Did not advance			9
Gabriel Rosillo	Men's −97 kg	Savolainen (FIN); L 1–3 ^{PP}	Did not advance				13
Mijaín López	Men's −130 kg	Alexuc-Ciurariu (ROU); W 4–0 ^{ST}	Mirzazadeh (IRI); W 4–0 ^{ST}	Kayaalp (TUR); W 3–0 ^{PO}	Bye	Kajaia (GEO); W 3–0 ^{PO}	1st place, gold medalist(s)

== See also ==
- Cuba at the 2019 Pan American Games
