= Boxing at the 2020 Summer Olympics – Men's lightweight =

Men's lightweight at the Games of the XXXII Olympiad
- Boxing pictogram
- Venue: Ryōgoku Kokugikan
- Dates: 25 July 2021; 8 August 2021
- Competitors: 29 from 29 nations

Medalists
| 1st place, gold medalist(s) | | Andy Cruz | Cuba |
| 2nd place, silver medalist(s) | | Keyshawn Davis | United States |
| 3rd place, bronze medalist(s) | | Hovhannes Bachkov | Armenia |
| 3rd place, bronze medalist(s) | | Harry Garside | Australia |

The men's lightweight boxing event at the 2020 Summer Olympics is scheduled to take place between 25 July and 8 August 2021 at the Ryōgoku Kokugikan. 29 boxers from 29 nations are expected to compete.

The medals for the competition were presented by William Frederick Blick, Uganda; IOC Member, and the medalists' bouquets were presented by Willi Kaltschmitt Luján, Guatemala; BTF Member.

== Background ==
This will be the 26th appearance of the men's lightweight event. The event appeared at the first Olympic boxing tournament in 1904 and has been held at every Games with boxing (that is, excluding 1912) since. The maximum weight for the lightweight class had been 60 kg since 1952; for 2020, with the removal of the light-welterweight class, the lightweight class expands from 56–60 kg to 57–63 kg.

Reigning World Champion Andy Cruz of Cuba has qualified for the Games. The 2016 Olympic champion, Robson Conceição of Brazil, turned professional and did not attempt to qualify.

== Qualification ==
A National Olympic Committee (NOC) could enter only 1 qualified boxer in the weight class. There were 28 quota places available for the men's lightweight, allocated as follows:

- 1 place for the host nation, Japan.
- 3 places at the 2020 African Boxing Olympic Qualification Tournament.
- 6 places at the 2020 Asia & Oceania Boxing Olympic Qualification Tournament.
- 8 places at the 2020 European Boxing Olympic Qualification Tournament.
- 5 places that were intended to be awarded at the 2021 Pan American Boxing Olympic Qualification Tournament, which was cancelled. These places were instead awarded through the world ranking list to the top boxers from the Americas who had been registered for the qualification tournament.
- 4 places that were intended to be awarded at a World Olympic Qualifying Tournament, which was cancelled. These places were instead awarded through the world ranking list, with one place for each continental zone (Africa, Asia & Oceania, Europe, Americas).
- 1 place for a Tripartite Commission invitation.

In addition, an invitation for the Refugee Olympic Team was made to Wessam Salamana, bringing the total number of boxers in the weight class to 29.

== Competition format ==
Like all Olympic boxing events, the competition is a straight single-elimination tournament. The competition begins with a preliminary round, where the number of competitors is reduced to 16, and concludes with a final. As there are fewer than 32 boxers in the competition, a number of boxers will receive a bye through the preliminary round. Both semifinal losers are awarded bronze medals.

Bouts consist of three three-minute rounds with a one-minute break between rounds. A boxer may win by knockout or by points. Scoring is on the "10-point-must" system, with 5 judges scoring each round. Judges consider "number of blows landed on the target areas, domination of the bout, technique and tactical superiority and competitiveness." Each judge determines a winner for each round, who receives 10 points for the round, and assigns the round's loser a number of points between 7 and 9 based on performance. The judge's scores for each round are added to give a total score for that judge. The boxer with the higher score from a majority of the judges is the winner.

== Schedule ==
The lightweight starts with the round of 32 on 25 July. There are five rest days before the round of 16 on 31 July, two more rest days before the quarterfinals on 3 August, two rest days before the semifinals on 6 August, and one day off before the final on 8 August.

Legend

| R32 | Round of 32 | R16 | Round of 16 | QF | Quarterfinals | SF | Semifinals | F | Final |

| Date | Jul 24 | | Jul 25 | | Jul 26 | | Jul 27 | | Jul 28 | | Jul 29 | | Jul 30 | | Jul 31 | | Aug 1 | | Aug 2 | | Aug 3 | | Aug 4 | | Aug 5 | | Aug 6 | | Aug 7 | | Aug 8 | |
| Event | A | E | A | E | A | E | A | E | A | E | A | E | A | E | A | E | A | E | A | E | A | E | A | E | A | E | A | E | A | E | A | E |
|---|---|---|---|---|---|---|---|---|---|---|---|---|---|---|---|---|---|---|---|---|---|---|---|---|---|---|---|---|---|---|---|---|
| Men's lightweight | | | R32 | | | | | | | | | | | | R16 | | | | | | QF | | | | | | SF | | | | F | |

== Results ==
=== Finals ===
| Final |
| Keyshawn Davis (USA) | 1 |
| Andy Cruz (CUB) | 4 |

=== Top half ===
Round of 32
Enrico Lacruz (NED) | 0
Keyshawn Davis (USA) | 5
Abdelhaq Nadir (MAR) | 1
Richarno Colin (MRI) | 4
Damian Durkacz (POL) | 0
Gabil Mamedov (ROC) | 5
Hovhannes Bachkov (ARM) | 5
Alston Ryan (ANT) | 0
Yaroslav Khartsyz (UKR) | 0
Javid Chalabiyev (AZE) | 5
Bakhodur Usmonov (TJK) | 4
Leonel de los Santos (DOM) | 1
Baatarsükhiin Chinzorig (MGL) | 1
Elnur Abduraimov (UZB) | 4

Round of 16
Sofiane Oumiha (FRA)
Keyshawn Davis (USA) | RSC
Richarno Colin (MRI) | 0
Gabil Mamedov (ROC) | 5
Hovhannes Bachkov (ARM) | 4
Javid Chalabiyev (AZE) | 1
Bakhodur Usmonov (TJK) | 0
Elnur Abduraimov (UZB) | 5

Quarterfinals
Keyshawn Davis (USA) | 4
Gabil Mamedov (ROC) | 1
Hovhannes Bachkov (ARM) | 5
Elnur Abduraimov (UZB) | 0

Semifinals
Keyshawn Davis (USA) | 5
Hovhannes Bachkov (ARM) | 0

=== Bottom half ===
Round of 32
Manish Kaushik (IND) | 1
Luke McCormack (GBR) | 4
Dzmitry Asanau (BLR) | 5
Obada Al-Kasbeh (JOR) | 0
Wessam Salamana (EOR) | 0
Wanderson Oliveira (BRA) | 5
Zakir Safiullin (KAZ) | 5
Leodan Pezo (PER) | 0
Daisuke Narimatsu (JPN) | 5
Fiston Mbaya (COD) | 0
Harry Garside (AUS) | 5
John Ume (PNG) | 0

Round of 16
Andy Cruz (CUB) | 5
Luke McCormack (GBR) | 0
Dzmitry Asanau (BLR) | 2
Wanderson Oliveira (BRA) | 3
Zakir Safiullin (KAZ) | WO
Daisuke Narimatsu (JPN)
Harry Garside (AUS) | 5
Jonas Jonas (NAM) | 0

Quarterfinals
Andy Cruz (CUB) | 4
Wanderson Oliveira (BRA) | 1
Zakir Safiullin (KAZ) | 2
Harry Garside (AUS) | 3

Semifinals
Andy Cruz (CUB) | 5
Harry Garside (AUS) | 0
