= Boxing at the 2020 Summer Olympics =

Boxing at the Games of the XXXII Olympiad
- Venue: Ryōgoku Kokugikan
- Dates: 24 July – 8 August 2021
- No. of events: 13
- Competitors: 289 from 81 nations

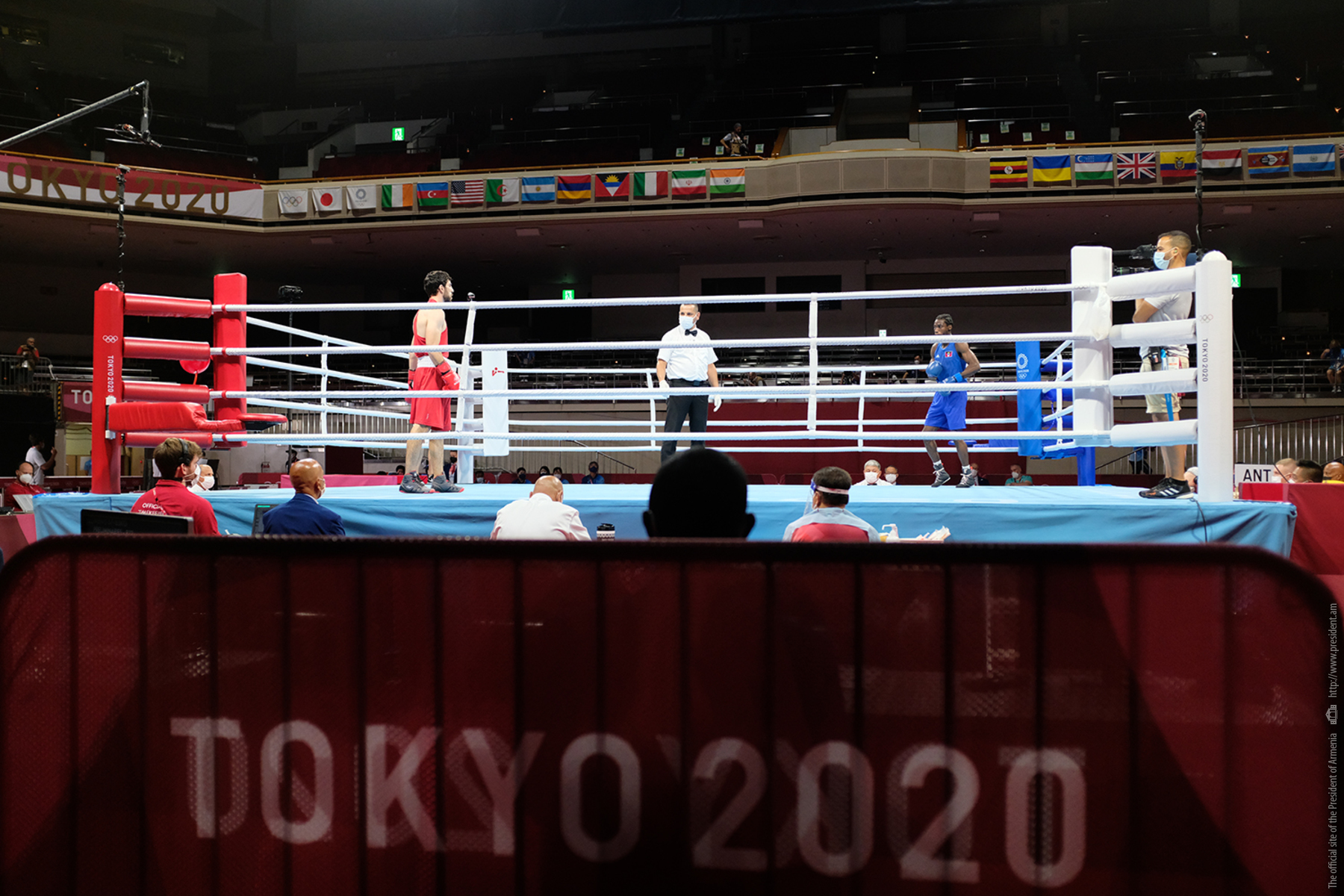
Ryōgoku Kokugikan

The boxing tournaments at the 2020 Summer Olympics in Tokyo took place from 24 July to 8 August 2021 at the Ryōgoku Kokugikan. Thirteen events were staged, the same number as in London in 2012 and Rio de Janeiro in 2016. However, for the first time since the London Games, the programme was updated, with the number of men's events reduced by two and the number of women's events increased by the same number.

On 22 May 2019, the International Olympic Committee (IOC) announced that the International Boxing Association (AIBA) had been stripped of the right to organise the tournament, due to "issues in the areas of finance, governance, ethics and refereeing and judging". Boxing was instead organised by an ad-hoc task force led by Morinari Watanabe, president of the International Gymnastics Federation.

== Competition format ==
On March 23, 2013, the AIBA instituted significant changes to the format. The World Series of Boxing, AIBA's pro team league which started in 2010, already enabled team members to retain 2012 Olympic eligibility. The newer AIBA Pro Boxing Tournament, consisting of pros who signed 5-year contracts with AIBA and competed on pro cards leading up to the tournament, also provided a pathway for new pros to retain their Olympic eligibility and retain ties with national committees. The elimination of headgear and the adoption of the "10-point must" scoring system further cleared the delineation between amateur and pro format.

The number of weight classes for men was reduced from ten to eight, with a featherweight class introduced and events at light-flyweight (introduced in 1968), bantamweight (staged at every Olympics since 1904 except 1912, when boxing events weren't held) and light-welterweight (introduced in 1952) removed. The women's weight classes saw a corresponding increase from three to five, with featherweight and welterweight categories introduced.

The IOC confirmed weight limits for all 13 classes on 19 June 2019.

Men contested matches in these eight weight classes:

- Flyweight (52kg)
- Featherweight (57kg)
- Lightweight (63 kg)
- Welterweight (69kg)
- Middleweight (75kg)
- Light heavyweight (81kg)
- Heavyweight (91kg)
- Super heavyweight (+91kg)

Women contested matches in these five weight classes:

- Flyweight (51kg)
- Featherweight (57kg)
- Lightweight (60kg)
- Welterweight (69kg)
- Middleweight (75kg)

== Qualifying criteria ==
Each National Olympic Committee was permitted to enter up to one athlete in each event. Six places (four men and two women) were reserved for the host nation Japan, while eight further places (five men and three women) were allocated to the Tripartite Invitation Commission.

All other places were allocated through four Continental Olympic Qualification Events (one each for Africa, the Americas, Asia/Oceania and Europe) between January 2020 and June 2021. The COVID-19 pandemic delayed several events for the boxing including impacting the first 3 days of the European Qualification Event. The Americas Qualification Event and World Olympic Qualification Event were then cancelled in 2021.

Weights	1	2	3	4	5	6	7	8
Men	27	27	29	23	25	22	17	17
Women	25	21	21	18	16			

== Participating nations ==
- Algeria (8)
- Antigua and Barbuda (1)
- Argentina (4)
- Armenia (3)
- Australia (5)
- Azerbaijan (5)
- Bahrain (1)
- Belarus (4)
- Botswana (2)
- Brazil (7)
- Bulgaria (3)
- Burundi (1)
- Cameroon (3)
- Canada (5)
- Cape Verde (1)
- China (6)
- Colombia (6)
- Croatia (2)
- Cuba (7)
- Democratic Republic of the Congo (4)
- Dominican Republic (7)
- Ecuador (4)
- Egypt (2)
- El Salvador (1)
- Eswatini (1)
- Finland (1)
- France (6)
- Georgia (3)
- Germany (3)
- Ghana (3)
- Great Britain (11)
- Guyana (1)
- Haiti (1)
- Hungary (1)
- India (9)
- Iran (2)
- Ireland (7)
- Italy (4)
- Jamaica (1)
- Japan (5)
- Jordan (5)
- Kazakhstan (9)
- Kenya (4)
- Kosovo (1)
- Mauritius (2)
- Mexico (3)
- Mongolia (3)
- Morocco (7)
- Mozambique (2)
- Namibia (1)
- Netherlands (2)
- New Zealand (1)
- Panama (1)
- Papua New Guinea (1)
- Peru (2)
- Philippines (4)
- Poland (4)
- Puerto Rico (1)
- Romania (2)
- Refugee Olympic Team (2)
- ROC (11)
- Samoa (2)
- Serbia (1)
- Slovakia (1)
- Somalia (1)
- South Korea (2)
- Spain (4)
- Sweden (2)
- Chinese Taipei (4)
- Tajikistan (3)
- Thailand (5)
- Trinidad and Tobago (1)
- Tunisia (2)
- Turkey (6)
- Uganda (3)
- Ukraine (5)
- United States (10)
- Uzbekistan (11)
- Venezuela (4)
- Vietnam (2)
- Zambia (3)

== Competition schedule ==
Legend

R32	Round of 32	R16	Round of 16	QF	Quarter-Finals	SF	Semi-Finals	F	Final

Date	Jul 24		Jul 25		Jul 26		Jul 27		Jul 28		Jul 29		Jul 30		Jul 31		Aug 1		Aug 2		Aug 3		Aug 4		Aug 5		Aug 6		Aug 7		Aug 8	
Event	A	E	A	E	A	E	A	E	A	E	A	E	A	E	A	E	A	E	A	E	A	E	A	E	A	E	A	E	A	E	A	E
Men's flyweight					R32										R16						QF				SF				F			
Men's featherweight	R32								R16								QF				SF				F							
Men's lightweight			R32												R16						QF						SF				F	
Men's welterweight	R32						R16						QF				SF					F										
Men's middleweight					R32						R16						QF								SF				F			
Men's light heavyweight			R32						R16				QF				SF						F									
Men's heavyweight	R32						R16						QF								SF						F					
Men's super heavyweight		R32									R16						QF						SF								F	
Women's flyweight			R32								R16						QF						SF						F			
Women's featherweight	R32				R16				QF						SF						F											
Women's lightweight							R32						R16								QF				SF						F	
Women's welterweight	R32						R16						QF										SF						F			
Women's middleweight									R16						QF												SF				F	

== Medal summary ==
=== Medal table ===
* Host nation (Japan)

Rank	NOC	Gold	Silver	Bronze	Total
1	Cuba	4	0	1	5
2	Great Britain	2	2	2	6
3	ROC	1	1	4	6
4	Brazil	1	1	1	3
5	Turkey	1	1	0	2
6	Japan*	1	0	2	3
7	Ireland	1	0	1	2
8	Bulgaria	1	0	0	1
8	Uzbekistan	1	0	0	1
10	United States	0	3	1	4
11	Philippines	0	2	1	3
12	China	0	2	0	2
13	Ukraine	0	1	0	1
14	Kazakhstan	0	0	2	2
15	Armenia	0	0	1	1
15	Australia	0	0	1	1
15	Azerbaijan	0	0	1	1
15	Chinese Taipei	0	0	1	1
15	Finland	0	0	1	1
15	Ghana	0	0	1	1
15	India	0	0	1	1
15	Italy	0	0	1	1
15	Netherlands	0	0	1	1
15	New Zealand	0	0	1	1
15	Thailand	0	0	1	1
Totals (25 entries)		13	13	26	52

=== Men ===
Event	Gold	Silver	Bronze
Flyweight	Galal Yafai; Great Britain	Carlo Paalam; Philippines	Saken Bibossinov; Kazakhstan
Flyweight	Galal Yafai; Great Britain	Carlo Paalam; Philippines	Ryomei Tanaka; Japan
Featherweight	Albert Batyrgaziev; ROC	Duke Ragan; United States	Lázaro Álvarez; Cuba
Featherweight	Albert Batyrgaziev; ROC	Duke Ragan; United States	Samuel Takyi; Ghana
Lightweight	Andy Cruz; Cuba	Keyshawn Davis; United States	Harry Garside; Australia
Lightweight	Andy Cruz; Cuba	Keyshawn Davis; United States	Hovhannes Bachkov; Armenia
Welterweight	Roniel Iglesias; Cuba	Pat McCormack; Great Britain	Andrey Zamkovoy; ROC
Welterweight	Roniel Iglesias; Cuba	Pat McCormack; Great Britain	Aidan Walsh; Ireland
Middleweight	Hebert Conceição; Brazil	Oleksandr Khyzhniak; Ukraine	Gleb Bakshi; ROC
Middleweight	Hebert Conceição; Brazil	Oleksandr Khyzhniak; Ukraine	Eumir Marcial; Philippines
Light heavyweight	Arlen López; Cuba	Benjamin Whittaker; Great Britain	Loren Alfonso; Azerbaijan
Light heavyweight	Arlen López; Cuba	Benjamin Whittaker; Great Britain	Imam Khataev; ROC
Heavyweight	Julio César La Cruz; Cuba	Muslim Gadzhimagomedov; ROC	Abner Teixeira; Brazil
Heavyweight	Julio César La Cruz; Cuba	Muslim Gadzhimagomedov; ROC	David Nyika; New Zealand
Super heavyweight	Bakhodir Jalolov; Uzbekistan	Richard Torrez; United States	Frazer Clarke; Great Britain
Super heavyweight	Bakhodir Jalolov; Uzbekistan	Richard Torrez; United States	Kamshybek Kunkabayev; Kazakhstan

=== Women ===
Games	Gold	Silver	Bronze
Flyweight	Stoyka Krasteva; Bulgaria	Buse Naz Çakıroğlu; Turkey	Tsukimi Namiki; Japan
Flyweight	Stoyka Krasteva; Bulgaria	Buse Naz Çakıroğlu; Turkey	Huang Hsiao-wen; Chinese Taipei
Featherweight	Sena Irie; Japan	Nesthy Petecio; Philippines	Karriss Artingstall; Great Britain
Featherweight	Sena Irie; Japan	Nesthy Petecio; Philippines	Irma Testa; Italy
Lightweight	Kellie Harrington; Ireland	Beatriz Ferreira; Brazil	Sudaporn Seesondee; Thailand
Lightweight	Kellie Harrington; Ireland	Beatriz Ferreira; Brazil	Mira Potkonen; Finland
Welterweight	Busenaz Sürmeneli; Turkey	Gu Hong; China	Lovlina Borgohain; India
Welterweight	Busenaz Sürmeneli; Turkey	Gu Hong; China	Oshae Jones; United States
Middleweight	Lauren Price; Great Britain	Li Qian; China	Nouchka Fontijn; Netherlands
Middleweight	Lauren Price; Great Britain	Li Qian; China	Zemfira Magomedalieva; ROC

== See also ==
- Boxing at the 2018 Asian Games
- Boxing at the 2018 Summer Youth Olympics
- Boxing at the 2019 Pan American Games
