= Masayuki Ito =

Japanese boxer (born 1991)

Personal information
- Nickname: The Judge
- Nationality: Japanese
- Born: 伊藤雅之; January 19, 1991 (age 35) Kōtō, Tokyo, Japan
- Height: 5 ft 8 1/2 in (174 cm)
- Weight: Super-featherweight; Lightweight

Boxing career
- Reach: 68 1/2 in (174 cm)
- Stance: Orthodox

Boxing record
- Total fights: 34
- Wins: 28
- Win by KO: 15
- Losses: 4
- Draws: 1

Masayuki Ito (born January 19, 1991) is a Japanese boxing promoter and former professional boxer who held the WBO super-featherweight title from 2018 to 2019.

== Professional career ==
=== Ito vs. Diaz ===
Ito turned professional in 2009 and amassed a record of 23-1-1 in 25 fights before challenging and beating Puerto Rican boxer Christopher Diaz for the vacant WBO junior lightweight title.

=== Ito vs. Herring ===
On 25 May 2019, Ito fought Jamel Herring for the WBO super featherweight title. The scorecards were announced as 110-118, 112-116, 110-118 in favor of the winner Jamel Herring.

=== Ito vs. Yoshino ===
On 9 April 2022, Ito fought Shuichiro Yoshino. Yoshino, who was ranked#5 by the WBO, #13 by the IBF and #15 by the WBC at lightweight beat Ito by technical decision in their 11 round contest.

== Boxing promoter ==
Masayuki Ito established TBP or (Treasure Boxing Promotion) to be involved in international boxing entertainment as he finishes his retirement ceremony in October 2022.

== Professional boxing record ==
32 fights	27 wins	4 losses
By knockout	15	0
By decision	12	4
Draws	1	

No.	Result	Record	Opponent	Type	Round, time	Date	Location	Notes
32	Loss	27–4–1	Shuichiro Yoshino	TD	11 (12)	2022-04-09	Saitama Super Arena, Saitama, Japan	For WBO Asia Pacific and OPBF lightweight titles; Unanimous TD after Ito was cut in an accidental head clash
31	Win	27–3–1	Valentine Hosokawa	TKO	8 (10), 1:17	2021-07-03	Korakuen Hall, Tokyo, Japan	
30	Loss	26–3–1	Hironori Mishiro	MD	10	2020-12-26	Sumida City Gymnasium, Tokyo, Japan	
29	Win	26–2–1	Ruben Manakane	TKO	6 (10), 1:08	2019-09-13	Korakuen Hall, Tokyo, Japan	
28	Loss	25–2–1	Jamel Herring	UD	12	2019-05-25	Osceola Heritage Park, Kissimmee, Florida, U.S.	Lost WBO super-featherweight title
27	Win	25–1–1	Evgeny Chuprakov	TKO	7 (12)	2018-12-30	Ota City General Gymnasium, Tokyo, Japan	Retained WBO super-featherweight title
26	Win	24–1–1	Christopher Díaz	UD	12	2018-07-28	Kissimmee Civic Center, Kissimmee, Florida, U.S.	Won vacant WBO super-featherweight title
25	Win	23–1–1	Vergil Puton	TKO	9 (10)	2018-03-03	Korakuen Hall, Tokyo, Japan	
24	Win	22–1–1	Glenn Enterina	TKO	6 (10)	2017-09-02	Korakuen Hall, Tokyo, Japan	
23	Win	21–1–1	Lorenzo Villanueva	TKO	9 (12)	2017-04-13	Korakuen Hall, Tokyo, Japan	Retained WBO Asia Pacific super-featherweight title
22	Win	20–1–1	Takuya Watanabe	UD	12	2016-12-31	Ota City General Gymnasium, Tokyo, Japan	Retained OPBF junior lightweight title; Won WBO Asia Pacific super-featherweight title
21	Win	19–1–1	Ernie Sanchez	TKO	11 (12)	2016-07-28	Korakuen Hall, Tokyo, Japan	Retained OPBF super-featherweight title
20	Win	18–1–1	Shingo Eto	UD	12	2015-12-14	Korakuen Hall, Tokyo, Japan	Retained OPBF super-featherweight title
19	Win	17–1–1	Dai Iwai	TKO	10 (12)	2015-08-10	Korakuen Hall, Tokyo, Japan	Won vacant OPBF super-featherweight title
18	Loss	16–1–1	Rikki Naito	MD	10	2015-02-09	Korakuen Hall, Tokyo, Japan	For Japanese super-featherweight title
17	Win	16–0–1	Ryan Sermona	TKO	1 (8)	2014-11-25	Korakuen Hall, Tokyo, Japan	
16	Win	15–0–1	Masao Nakamura	UD	8	2014-07-30	Korakuen Hall, Tokyo, Japan	
15	Win	14–0–1	Kazuya Nakano	KO	7 (8)	2014-04-14	Korakuen Hall, Tokyo, Japan	
14	Win	13–0–1	Kentaro Yamada	TKO	2 (8)	2013-12-09	Korakuen Hall, Tokyo, Japan	
13	Win	12–0–1	Jeffrey Arienza	TKO	10 (10)	2013-09-30	Korakuen Hall, Tokyo, Japan	Won vacant WBC Youth lightweight title
12	Win	11–0–1	Taiki Minamoto	UD	8	2013-07-19	Korakuen Hall, Tokyo, Japan	
11	Win	10–0–1	Yasuyuki Masuda	UD	8	2013-04-08	Korakuen Hall, Tokyo, Japan	
10	Win	9–0–1	Kosuke Saka	UD	5	2012-12-16	Korakuen Hall, Tokyo, Japan	
9	Win	8–0–1	Kazuyuki Yamao	UD	5	2012-11-04	Korakuen Hall, Tokyo, Japan	
8	Win	7–0–1	Kazuhiro Miura	UD	4	2012-09-27	Korakuen Hall, Tokyo, Japan	
7	Win	6–0–1	Masaru Sueyoshi	SD	4	2012-07-31	Korakuen Hall, Tokyo, Japan	
6	Win	5–0–1	Kyohei Tsunashima	TKO	3 (4)	2012-05-29	Korakuen Hall, Tokyo, Japan	
5	Draw	4–0–1	Tsuyoshi Tameda	SD	4	2011-09-28	Korakuen Hall, Tokyo, Japan	
4	Win	4–0	Tatsushi Kagawa	RTD	2 (4)	2010-11-02	Korakuen Hall, Tokyo, Japan	
3	Win	3–0	Shunsuke Takatsu	TKO	1 (4)	2010-08-09	Korakuen Hall, Tokyo, Japan	
2	Win	2–0	Takahiro Ozawa	TD	3 (4)	2010-04-12	Korakuen Hall, Tokyo, Japan	
1	Win	1–0	Katsunari Fujii	UD	4	2009-05-26	Korakuen Hall, Tokyo, Japan	

== Retirement and promotions career ==
Ito retired after his bout with Shuichiro Yoshino. He started promoting boxers thereafter.

== See also ==
- List of super-featherweight boxing champions
- List of Japanese boxing world champions

Sporting positions
Regional boxing titles
Vacant Title last held by Jomthong Chuwattana	OPBF Super featherweight champion August 10, 2015 – 2017; Vacated	Vacant Title next held by Carlo Magali
World boxing titles
Vacant Title last held by Vasyl Lomachenko	WBO Super featherweight champion July 28, 2018 – May 25, 2019	Succeeded by Jamel Herring
