= Keyshawn Davis =

American boxer (born 1999)

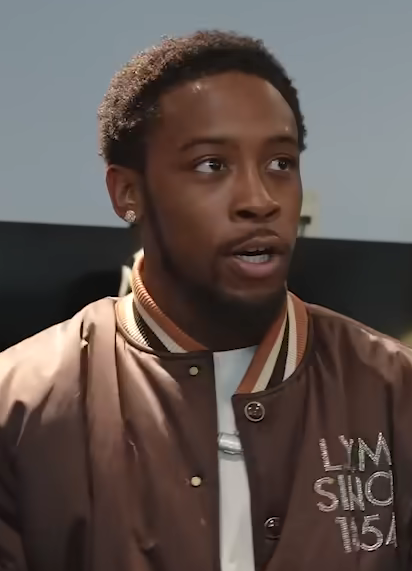
- Davis in 2026

Personal information
- Nickname: The Businessman
- Born: Keyshawn Daniel Webster Davis; February 28, 1999 (age 27) Norfolk, Virginia, U.S.
- Height: 5 ft 9 in (175 cm)
- Weight: Lightweight; Super lightweight

Boxing career
- Reach: 70 in (178 cm)
- Stance: Orthodox

Boxing record
- Total fights: 16
- Wins: 15
- Win by KO: 10
- No contests: 1
Medal record
Men's Amateur boxing
Representing United States
Olympic Games
Silver medal – second place	2020 Tokyo	Lightweight
World Championships
Silver medal – second place	2019 Yekaterinburg	Light welterweight
Pan American Games
Silver medal – second place	2019 Lima	Light welterweight

Keyshawn Davis (born February 28, 1999) is an American professional boxer. He held the World Boxing Organization (WBO) lightweight title from February to June 2025. As an amateur, Davis won silver medals at the 2019 Pan American Games, 2019 World Championships, and 2020 Summer Olympics.

== Amateur career ==
As an amateur, he trained at the Alexandria Boxing Club.

=== Olympic Games results ===
Tokyo 2020

- Round of 32: Defeated Enrico Lacruz (Netherlands) 5–0
- Round of 16: Defeated Sofiane Oumiha (France) RSC
- Quarter-finals: Defeated Gabil Mamedov (Russian Olympic Committee) 4–1
- Semi-Finals: Defeated Hovhannes Bachkov (Armenia) 5–0
- Finals: Defeated by Andy Cruz (Cuba) 4–1

=== Pan American Games results ===
Lima 2019

- Quarter-finals: Defeated Luis Arcon (Venezuela) W/O
- Semi-finals: Defeated Michael Alexander (Trinidad and Tobago) 5–0
- Final: Defeated by Andy Cruz (Cuba) 4–1

=== World Championship results ===
Yekaterinburg 2019

- Round of 32: Defeated Elnur Abduraimov (Uzbekistan) 5–0
- Round of 16: Defeated Michael Alexander (Trinidad and Tobago) 5–0
- Quarter-finals: Defeated Sofiane Oumiha (France) 5–0
- Semi-finals: Defeated Hovhannes Bachkov (Armenia) 4–1
- Final: Defeated by Andy Cruz (Cuba) 5–0

== Professional career ==
=== Early career ===
Davis made his professional debut against Lester Brown on February 27, 2021. In the second round, Davis dropped his opponent with a left hook to the head. Brown managed to recover from the knockdown and continue, however Davis secured victory after landing a combination of heavy punches which forced the referee to step in and end the bout. Davis' second bout as a professional was against Richman Ashelley on April 3, 2021. Davis was dominant throughout the bout and in the fourth round, landed a number of heavy punches which visibly hurt his opponent. This resulted in Ashelley retiring at the end of the round after his corner team judged that he was unable to continue.

Davis was taken the distance for the first time as a professional when he fought against Jose Antonio Meza on the undercard of Canelo Álvarez vs. Billy Joe Saunders on May 8, 2021. Davis won via wide unanimous decision after winning every round on each of the three scorecards.

=== 2024 ===
==== Davis vs. Pedraza ====
On February 8, 2024, in Las Vegas, Davis defeated Jose Pedraza by TKO in the sixth round.

==== Davis vs. Madueno ====
Davis was scheduled to face Miguel Madueno on July 6, 2024 at Prudential Center in Newark, New Jersey. He won the fight by unanimous decision.

==== Davis vs. Lemos ====
On August 22, 2024, it was reported that Davis would face Gustavo Daniel Lemos at Scope Arena in Norfolk, Virginia on November 8, 2024. Davis knocked Lemos down three times in the second round and won the fight by TKO.

=== WBO Lightweight Championship ===
==== Davis vs. Berinchyk ====
Davis challenged Denys Berinchyk for his WBO lightweight title on February 14, 2025 in New York. He won by knockout in round number four by landing a left shot to the body.

==== Canceled Bout vs. De Los Santos ====
Davis was scheduled to make the first defense of his title against Edwin De Los Santos at Scope Arena in Norfolk, VA, on June 7, 2025. After failing to make the correct weight limit, Davis was stripped of the title, meaning only De Los Santos was eligible to win the title. Subsequently, the two sides entered a lengthy negotiation in an effort to keep the main event intact. The fight was canceled after the two sides couldn't come to an agreement.

=== 2026 ===
==== Davis vs. Ortiz ====
Following the De Los Santos fiasco, Davis opted to abandon the lightweight division. He was scheduled to face Jamaine Ortiz at super lightweight on January 31, 2026, in New York. Davis won via technical knockout in the 12th round after sending his opponent to the canvas with a punch to his body.

==== Davis vs. Albright 2 ====
Davis was scheduled to face Nahir Albright in a 12-round super lightweight rematch at Norfolk Scope Arena in Norfolk, Virginia, on May 16, 2026. He won by unanimous decision.

== Professional boxing record ==
16 fights	15 wins	0 losses
By knockout	10	0
By decision	5	0
No contests	1	

No.	Result	Record	Opponent	Type	Round, time	Date	Location	Notes
16	Win	15–0 (1)	Nahir Albright	UD	12	May 16, 2026	Scope Arena, Norfolk, Virginia, U.S.	
15	Win	14–0 (1)	Jamaine Ortiz	TKO	12 (12), 2:47	Jan 31, 2026	Madison Square Garden, New York City, New York, U.S.	
14	Win	13–0 (1)	Denys Berinchyk	KO	4 (12), 1:45	Feb 14, 2025	The Theater at Madison Square Garden, New York City, New York, U.S.	Won WBO lightweight title
13	Win	12–0 (1)	Gustavo Daniel Lemos	KO	2 (10), 1:09	Nov 8, 2024	Scope Arena, Norfolk, Virginia, U.S.	Retained WBO Inter-Continental lightweight title; Won vacant IBF Inter-Continental lightweight title
12	Win	11–0 (1)	Miguel Madueno	UD	10	Jul 6, 2024	Prudential Center, Newark, New Jersey, U.S.	Retained IBF-USBA, WBO Inter-Continental, and WBC–USNBC lightweight titles
11	Win	10–0 (1)	José Pedraza	TKO	6 (10), 1:09	Feb 8, 2024	Michelob Ultra Arena, Paradise, Nevada, U.S.	Retained WBO Inter-Continental and WBC–USNBC lightweight titles; Won vacant IBF–USBA lightweight title
10	NC	9–0 (1)	Nahir Albright	NC	10	Oct 15, 2023	Fort Bend Community Center, Rosenberg, Texas, U.S.	Retained WBO Inter-Continental and WBC–USNBC lightweight titles; Originally a MD win for Davis, later overturned after he tested positive for marijuana
9	Win	9–0	Francesco Patera	UD	10	Jul 22, 2023	Firelake Arena, Shawnee, Oklahoma, U.S.	Retained WBO Inter-Continental and WBC–USNBC lightweight titles
8	Win	8–0	Anthony Yigit	TKO	9 (10), 0:21	Apr 8, 2023	Prudential Center, Newark, New Jersey, U.S.	Retained WBO Inter-Continental lightweight title; Won vacant WBC–USNBC lightweight title
7	Win	7–0	Juan Carlos Burgos	UD	8	Dec 10, 2022	Madison Square Garden, New York City, New York, U.S.	Won vacant WBO Inter-Continental lightweight title
6	Win	6–0	Omar Tienda Bahena	TKO	5 (8), 1:38	Sep 23, 2022	Prudential Center, Newark, New Jersey, U.S.	
5	Win	5–0	Esteban Sanchez	TKO	6 (8), 2:44	Apr 30, 2022	MGM Grand Garden Arena, Paradise, Nevada, U.S.	
4	Win	4–0	Jose Zaragoza	TKO	2 (6), 2:45	Dec 11, 2021	Madison Square Garden, New York City, New York, U.S.	
3	Win	3–0	Jose Antonio Meza	UD	6	May 8, 2021	AT&T Stadium, Arlington, Texas, U.S.	
2	Win	2–0	Richman Ashelley	RTD	4 (6), 3:00	Apr 3, 2021	Caesars Palace Bluewaters, Dubai, United Arab Emirates	
1	Win	1–0	Lester Brown	TKO	2 (4), 2:50	Feb 27, 2021	Hard Rock Stadium, Miami Gardens, Florida, U.S.	

== See also ==
- List of male boxers
- List of world lightweight boxing champions

Sporting positions
Amateur boxing titles
Previous: Maliek Montgomery	Golden Gloves lightweight champion 2017	Next: Doctress Robinson
Previous: Delante Johnson	U.S. lightweight champion 2017–2018	Next: Vacant
Regional boxing titles
Vacant Title last held by Isaac Cruz	WBO Inter-Continental lightweight champion December 10, 2022 - November 2024; Vacated	Vacant Title next held by Yongqiang Yang
Vacant Title last held by Ruben Torres	WBC-USA lightweight champion April 8, 2023 – February 14, 2025; Won world title	Vacant
Vacant Title last held by Jamaine Ortiz	IBF-USBA lightweight champion February 8, 2024 – February 14, 2025; Won world title	Vacant
World boxing titles
Preceded by Denys Berinchyk	WBO lightweight champion February 14 – June 6, 2025; Stripped	Vacant Title next held by Abdullah Mason
