= Jamaine Ortiz =

American boxer (born 1996)

Personal information
- Nickname: The Technician
- Born: April 28, 1996 (age 30) Worcester, Massachusetts, U.S.
- Height: 5 ft 8 in (173 cm)
- Weight: Lightweight; Light welterweight

Boxing career
- Stance: Orthodox

Boxing record
- Total fights: 24
- Wins: 20
- Win by KO: 10
- Losses: 3
- Draws: 1

Jamaine Ortiz (born April 28, 1996) is an American professional boxer. He challenged for the World Boxing Organization (WBO) junior welterweight title in 2024.

== Boxing career ==
Ortiz made his professional debut on May 13, 2016. Ortiz has held USBA and NABF titles during his career. Ortiz scored his first major victory of his in an upset win over former WBO junior lightweight champion Jamel Herring on May 21, 2021, to defend his NABF and capture the IBF USBA lightweight titles.

=== Ortiz vs. Lomachenko ===
Ortiz's first 12 round match where he suffered his first professional defeat against Vasiliy Lomachenko on October 29, 2022.

=== Ortiz vs. Lopez ===
On February 8, 2024 in Las Vegas, Ortiz challenged Teofimo Lopez for his WBO junior welterweight title, but lost the fight by a highly controversial unanimous decision where many analysts, retired fighters and social media personalities believed Jamaine Ortiz was robbed.

=== Ortiz vs. Alamo ===
Jamaine Ortiz defeated Yomar Alamo by unanimous decision on March 15, 2025 in Orlando, FL to retain his WBA Continental USA super lightweight title.

=== Ortiz vs. Davis ===
Ortiz was scheduled to face Keyshawn Davis in a super-lightweight bout in New York on January 31, 2026. He lost via technical knockout in the 12th round after being sent to the canvas by a punch to his body.

== Professional boxing record ==
24 fights	20 wins	3 losses
By knockout	10	1
By decision	10	2
Draws	1	

No.	Result	Record	Opponent	Type	Round, time	Date	Location	Notes
24	Loss	20–3–1	(United States) Keyshawn Davis	TKO	12 (12), 2:47	Jan 31, 2026	(United States) Madison Square Garden, New York City, New York, U.S.	
23	Win	20–2–1	(Dominican Republic) Ambiorix Bautista	TKO	3 (10), 1:32	Aug 23, 2025	(United States) Caribe Royale Orlando, Orlando, Florida, U.S.	
22	Win	19–2–1	(Puerto Rico) Yomar Álamo	UD	10	Mar 15, 2025	(United States) Caribe Royale Orlando, Orlando, Florida, U.S.	
21	Win	18–2–1	(Argentina) Cristian Ruben Mino	TKO	4 (10), 2:00	Nov 1, 2024	(United States) Caribe Royale Orlando, Orlando, Florida, U.S.	Won WBA Continental Americas super lightweight title
20	Loss	17–2–1	(United States) Teofimo Lopez	UD	12	Feb 8, 2024	(United States) Michelob Ultra Arena, Paradise, Nevada, U.S.	For WBO and The Ring light welterweight titles
19	Win	17–1–1	(Mexico) Antonio Moran	UD	10	Sep 15, 2023	(United States) American Bank Center, Corpus Christi, Texas, U.S.	
18	Loss	16–1–1	(Ukraine) Vasiliy Lomachenko	UD	12	Oct 29, 2022	(United States) Madison Square Garden, New York City, New York, U.S.	Lost North American Boxing Federation Lightweight Title
17	Win	16–0–1	(United States) Jamel Herring	UD	10	May 21, 2022	(United States) Resorts World Las Vegas, Paradise, Nevada, U.S.	Won vacant IBF USBA Lightweight Title, Retained North American Boxing Federation Lightweight Title
16	Win	15–0–1	(United States) Nahir Albright	UD	10	Feb 18, 2022	(United States) Caribe Royale Orlando, Orlando, Florida, U.S.	Won vacant North American Boxing Federation Lightweight Title
15	Draw	14–0–1	(United States) Joseph Adorno	MD	8	Apr 24, 2021	(United States) Silver Spurs Arena, Kissimmee, Florida, U.S.	
14	Win	14–0	(Uganda) Sulaiman Segawa	KO	7 (8) 2:50	Nov 28, 2020	(United States) Staples Center, Los Angeles, California, U.S.	Won vacant WBC USA Silver Lightweight Title
13	Win	13–0	(Mexico) Luis Castillo Leal	TKO	2 (8) 2:11	Feb 28, 2020	(United States) Palladium, Worcester, Massachusetts, U.S.	
12	Win	12–0	(France) Romain Couture	UD	8	Sep 9, 2019	(United States) Twin River Event Center, Lincoln, Rhode Island, U.S.	Won vacant WBC Youth Intercontinental Super Lightweight Title
11	Win	11–0	(Brazil) Vitor Jones	TKO	1 (6) 1:50	Apr 26, 2019	(United States) Twin River Event Center, Lincoln, Rhode Island, U.S.	
10	Win	10–0	(United States) Ricardo Quiroz	UD	8	Feb 23, 2019	(United States) Twin River Event Center, Lincoln, Rhode Island, U.S.	Won vacant WBC Youth World Lightweight Title
9	Win	9–0	(United States) Tyrone Luckey	TKO	3 (6) 2:54	May 11, 2018	(United States) Twin River Event Center, Lincoln, Rhode Island, U.S.	
8	Win	8–0	(Mexico) Victor Rosas	UD	6	Feb 23, 2018	(United States) Twin River Event Center, Lincoln, Rhode Island, U.S.	
7	Win	7–0	(United States) Derrick Murray	UD	6	Dec 7, 2017	(United States) Twin River Event Center, Lincoln, Rhode Island, U.S.	
6	Win	6–0	(United States) Darnell Pettis	RTD	3 (4)	Sep 16, 2017	(United States) Twin River Event Center, Lincoln, Rhode Island, U.S.	
5	Win	5–0	(Puerto Rico) Angel Figueroa	UD	4	Aug 26, 2017	(United States) Foxwoods Resort, Mashantucket, Connecticut, U.S.	
4	Win	4–0	(United States) Glenn Mitchell	TKO	3 (4)	Apr 7, 2017	(United States) Twin River Event Center, Lincoln, Rhode Island, U.S.	
3	Win	3–0	(United States) Canton Miller	MD	4	Feb 4, 2017	(United States) Twin River Event Center, Lincoln, Rhode Island, U.S.	
2	Win	2–0	(Canada) Kimmy St Pierre	RTD	3 (4)	Jul 15, 2016	(United States) Twin River Event Center, Lincoln, Rhode Island, U.S.	
1	Win	1–0	(United States) Josh Parker	RTD	1 (4) 3:00	May 13, 2016	(United States) Twin River Event Center, Lincoln, Rhode Island, U.S.	Professional debut
