= Jamel Herring =

American boxer (born 1985)

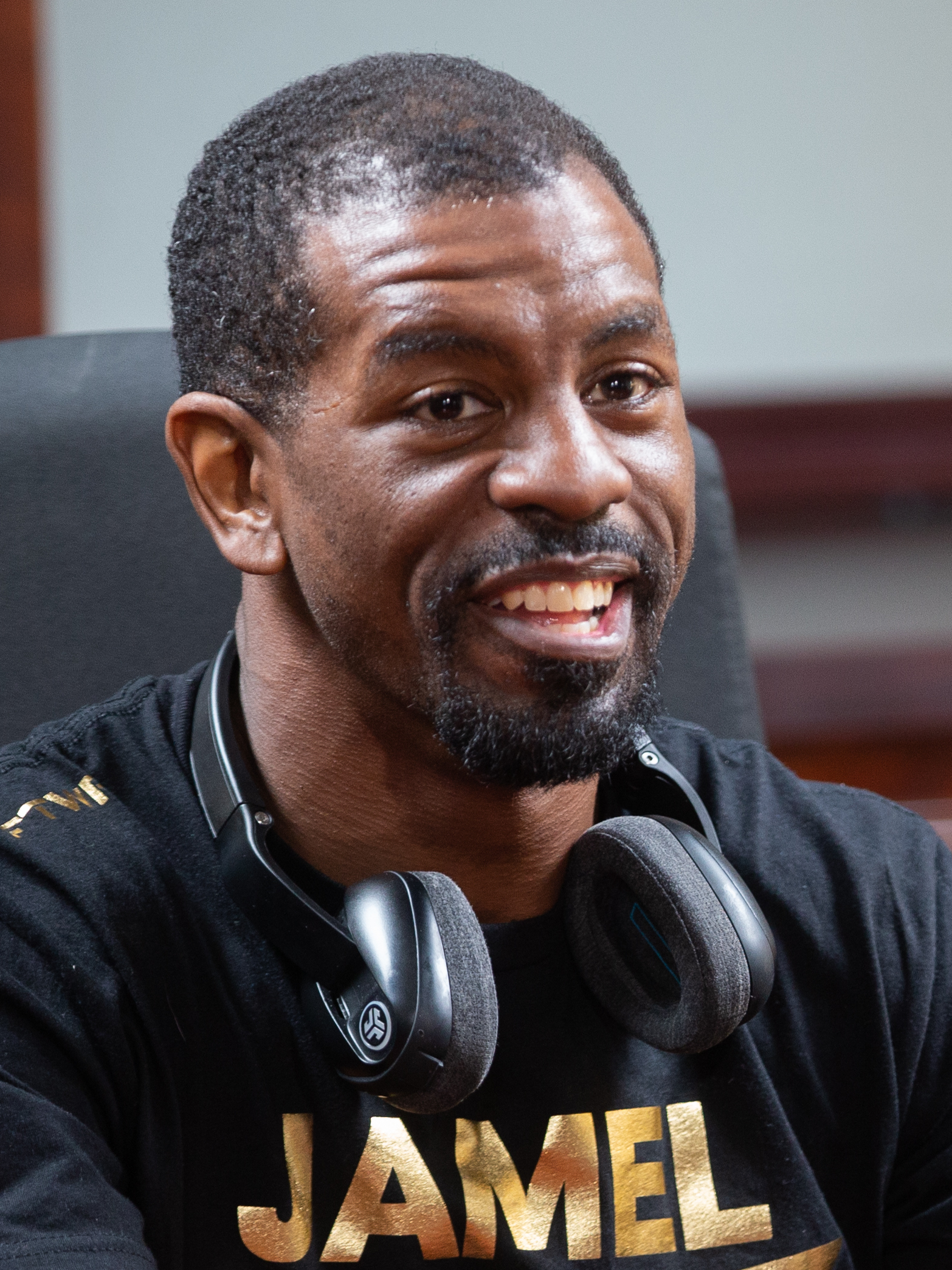
- Herring in 2019

Personal information
- Nickname: Semper Fi
- Born: Jamel William Herring; October 30, 1985 (age 40) Rockville Centre, New York, U.S.
- Height: 5 ft 10 in (178 cm)
- Weight: Super-featherweight; Lightweight

Boxing career
- Reach: 70 in (178 cm)
- Stance: Southpaw

Boxing record
- Total fights: 29
- Wins: 24
- Win by KO: 12
- Losses: 5
Medal record
Men's amateur boxing
US National Championships
Gold medal – first place	2012 Fort Carson	Light welterweight

Jamel William Herring (born October 30, 1985) is a former American professional boxer where he held the WBO junior lightweight title from 2019 to 2021. He is currently a bare-knuckle boxer for Bare Knuckle Fighting Championship, where he is the current BKFC Bantamweight Champion.

== Early life ==
Herring was born in Rockville Centre, New York, to Michael Mitchell and Jeanine Herring. His mother remarried to Harry Elliby. He was raised in Coram, New York, in its Gordon Heights neighborhood. While a sophomore at Longwood High School, Jamel began boxing in 2001 when his soon to become trainer Austin Hendrickson invited him to the boxing gym for workouts. Herring enlisted in the United States Marine Corps in October 2003 at Parris Island, South Carolina. He has served two tours of duty in Iraq and was based in Camp Lejeune, North Carolina, where he earned the rank of Sergeant.

== Amateur career ==
Herring began training in 2001. He suffered his first amateur loss to Daniel Jacobs on July 20, 2002, during the New York Junior Olympics Finals.

Herring had to balance training as a boxer with his duties as an active United States Marine. He was deployed to Fallujah, Iraq in 2005. After he returned he immediately tried out for the All Marine Corps boxing team in January 2006. While on the team, Herring competed all over the national scene and even fought against former world champion Jesse Vargas at the 2006 National PAL tournament. He was deployed again in 2007 to Al Taqaddum. Shortly after his return, he went back to the All Marine Corps boxing team in Camp Lejeune, North Carolina. From early 2008, he would be trained under Ron Simms, Reuben Woodruff, and Narcisco Aleman. Simms would eventually be replaced by former All Army coach and 1996 USA Olympic Assistant coach Jesse Ravelo. Herring won a silver medal at the 2010 World Military Games and took a gold medal at the 2011 and 2012 Armed Forces Championships while a Sergeant in the United States Marine Corps.

Trained under Ravelo, Woodruff, and Aleman, Jamel would win gold in the 2012 Olympic Trials defeating multiple nationals champions. In the first round of the tournament he defeated Tommy Duquette, Mike Reed in the second round, Pedro Sosa in the semi-finals, and in the finals he defeated Pedro Sosa again. He would eventually move on to the 2011 AIBA World Championships but lost in a close contest in the first round, forcing him to fight for his spot again at the 2012 USA Boxing Nationals. After winning the Nationals, he went on to compete in the Americas Qualifiers where he would win a bronze medal and earn a slot at the 2012 games. Herring qualified for the 2012 Olympics. Jamel, along with the entire US boxing team, only had two weeks prior to the games to train together as a complete team. He was the only United States Marine to compete at the London Olympics and the first active duty marine to qualify for the US boxing team since 1992.

== Professional career ==
After returning from the London games, Herring made the decision to finish out his service with the United States Marine Corps and become a professional boxer. He relocated from Camp Lejeune, North Carolina, to Cincinnati, Ohio, to work with Mike Stafford.

In May 2019, he became a world champion by defeating Masayuki Ito to win the WBO junior lightweight title. Herring outboxed Ito in front of the sold-out crowd, winning almost every round of the fight on two judges' scorecards, and 66 percent of the rounds on the third judge's. Scorecards were 118-110, 118-110 and 116-112 in favor of Herring.

In his first title defense, Herring faced Lamont Roach Jr. Herring boxed well through most of the fight, but Roach Jr was far from an easy opponent. Herring was almost dropped by Roach Jr in the ninth round, but managed to recover just before the bell. In the end, he had done enough to earn the unanimous decision win, 117-111 twice and 115-113 on the scorecards.

His second title defense came against Jonathan Oquendo, on September 5, 2020, after two previously cancelled dates, both because Herring tested positive for COVID-19. Herring was in control during the fight, and was landing the more effective shots. Herring managed to drop Oquendo in the third round. The aggressive Oquendo was going head first in multiple occasions during the fight, which ultimately resulted in a cut above Herring's eye. Herring was not able to continue after the eighth round and his corner decided he is unable to continue.

In September 2020, it was announced that Herring had signed a contract with management and promotions company MTK Global, with the company taking an advisory role. Herring said of the decision, "I'm very excited about this next step in my career. I know that by adding MTK Global as an advisor along with Brian McIntyre as my manager, I have the strongest team in the game."

On April 3, 2021, Herring defeated former two-division champion Carl Frampton in Dubai, United Arab Emirates via sixth-round technical knockout to retain his WBO title. Herring's victory over Frampton would ultimately be the last fight of the latter's career, who retired soon after.

Herring lost his title in his subsequent fight on October 23, 2021, against undefeated former WBO featherweight champion Shakur Stevenson, when he was defeated via tenth-round technical knockout. Herring was behind on all three judges' scorecards at the time of the stoppage. He retired in May 2022.

== Bare-knuckle boxing ==
Herrimg made his Bare Knuckle Fighting Championship debut against Matt Guymon on January 17, 2026 at BKFC 86. He won the fight by unanimous decision.

Herring was scheduled to face Nate Maness for the vacant BKFC Bantamweight Championship on May 22, 2026 at BKFC 89. However, Maness withdrew due to not being medically cleared and was replaced by Michael Larrimore. Herring won the championship by unanimous decision.

Herring defended his title against John Dodson on October 17, 2026 at BKFC 95. He won the fight by unanimous decision.

== Personal life ==
Herring has six children: Kamren Herring (2004), Stephen Herring (2007), Ariyanah Herring (2009), Jamel Herring Jr. (2010), Jazmyne Herring (2013), and Justice Herring (2017). His daughter Ariyanah died July 27, 2009, from SIDS. The opening ceremony of the 2012 Olympic Games was the 3rd anniversary of her death. He married his childhood friend Jennifer Dickerson-Herring on September 26, 2015.

== Legal issues ==
On January 9, 2025 Herring was arrested by the City of Mason (Ohio) Police Department after an incident was reported the day before by his wife Jennifer. The charge he was arrested for was assault and domestic violence. He remained in custody at Warren County Jail. The incident occurred on January 4 at 2 a.m. after Herring entered their home “extremely intoxicated” and started to bully Jennifer, in relation to marital issues. The police report read, “‘viciously’ attacking her by punching her all over her body, pulled her hair and threw her across the room. ... Mrs. Herring then stated Mr. Herring choked her ... and she felt he was going to kill her because she had trouble breathing.” A court date was set for January 21. Jennifer dropped the charges in February, but applied for a permanent restraining order against Jamel, which he broke on March 18, 2025 and arrested on two charges, one of them being 'violation of a protective order'.

== Championships and accomplishments ==
- Bare Knuckle Fighting Championship
  - BKFC Bantamweight Champion (One time)

== Professional boxing record ==
29 fights	24 wins	5 losses
By knockout	12	2
By decision	11	3
By disqualification	1	0

No.	Result	Record	Opponent	Type	Round, time	Date	Location	Notes
29	Loss	24–5	Jackson Jon England	SD	10	Apr 3, 2024	Adelaide Arena, Adelaide, Australia	For vacant WBO Global junior lightweight title
28	Win	24–4	Nicholas Molina	TKO	1 (8), 2:49	Nov 7, 2023	Edison Ballroom, Manhattan, New York, U.S.	
27	Loss	23–4	Jamaine Ortiz	UD	10	May 21, 2022	Resorts World Las Vegas, Las Vegas, Nevada, U.S.	For NABF and vacant USBA lightweight titles
26	Loss	23–3	Shakur Stevenson	TKO	10 (12), 1:30	Oct 23, 2021	State Farm Arena, Atlanta, Georgia, U.S.	Lost WBO junior lightweight title
25	Win	23–2	Carl Frampton	TKO	6 (12), 1:40	Apr 3, 2021	The Rotunda Caesars Palace Bluewaters, Dubai, United Arab Emirates	Retained WBO junior lightweight title
24	Win	22–2	Jonathan Oquendo	DQ	8 (12), 3:00	Sep 5, 2020	MGM Grand Conference Center, Paradise, Nevada, U.S.	Retained WBO junior lightweight title; Oquendo disqualified for repeated headbutts
23	Win	21–2	Lamont Roach Jr.	UD	12	Nov 9, 2019	Chukchansi Park, Fresno, California, U.S.	Retained WBO junior lightweight title
22	Win	20–2	Masayuki Ito	UD	12	May 25, 2019	Osceola Heritage Park, Kissimmee, Florida, U.S.	Won WBO junior lightweight title
21	Win	19–2	Adeilson Dos Santos	UD	8	Dec 14, 2018	American Bank Center, Corpus Christi, Texas, U.S.	
20	Win	18–2	John Vincent Moralde	UD	10	Sep 14, 2018	Save Mart Center, Fresno, California, U.S.	Won vacant IBF-USBA junior lightweight title
19	Win	17–2	Juan Pablo Sanchez	TKO	5 (8), 1:28	May 12, 2018	Madison Square Garden, New York City, New York, U.S.	
18	Loss	16–2	Ladarius Miller	UD	10	Aug 22, 2017	Sam's Town Hotel and Gambling Hall, Sunrise Manor, Nevada, U.S.	
17	Win	16–1	Art Hovhannisyan	RTD	3 (8), 3:00	Feb 10, 2017	Huntington Center, Toledo, Ohio, U.S.	
16	Loss	15–1	Denis Shafikov	TKO	10 (10), 0:36	Jul 2, 2016	Santander Arena, Reading, Pennsylvania, U.S.	
15	Win	15–0	Luis Eduardo Florez	UD	10	Feb 9, 2016	Sands Casino Resort, Bethlehem, Pennsylvania, U.S.	
14	Win	14–0	Yakubu Amidu	UD	10	Oct 3, 2015	U.S. Bank Arena, Cincinnati, Ohio, U.S.	
13	Win	13–0	Ariel Vasquez	TKO	3 (10), 0:50	Aug 28, 2015	Walter E. Washington Convention Center, Washington, D.C., U.S.	
12	Win	12–0	Hector Velazquez	UD	8	Jun 26, 2015	Little Creek Casino Resort, Shelton, Washington, U.S.	
11	Win	11–0	Hector Marengo	UD	8	Mar 6, 2015	MGM Grand Marquee Ballroom, Paradise, Nevada, U.S.	
10	Win	10–0	Jose Del Valle	KO	2 (8), 1:49	Dec 12, 2014	UIC Pavilion, Chicago, Illinois, U.S.	
9	Win	9–0	Luis Alberto Pelayo	TKO	2 (6), 1:04	Sep 11, 2014	The Joint, Paradise, Nevada, U.S.	
8	Win	8–0	Rogelio Casarez	TKO	2 (8), 2:22	May 2, 2014	Hard Rock Hotel and Casino, Paradise, Nevada, U.S.	
7	Win	7–0	Antonio Sanchez	SD	6	Jan 25, 2014	D.C. Armory, Washington, D.C., U.S.	
6	Win	6–0	Lance Williams	TKO	2 (6), 2:59	Dec 14, 2013	Alamodome, San Antonio, Texas, U.S.	
5	Win	5–0	Justin Robbins	RTD	3 (6), 3:00	Sep 30, 2013	Barclays Center, New York City, New York, U.S.	
4	Win	4–0	Calvin Smith	UD	4	Jun 22, 2013	Barclays Center, New York City, New York, U.S.	
3	Win	3–0	Victor Galindo	TKO	1 (4), 2:01	May 18, 2013	Boardwalk Hall, Atlantic City, New Jersey, U.S.	
2	Win	2–0	Carlos Lopez	RTD	3 (4), 3:00	Feb 16, 2013	Boardwalk Hall, Atlantic City, New Jersey, U.S.	
1	Win	1–0	Jose M Valderrama	UD	4	Dec 8, 2012	Business Expo Center, Anaheim, California, U.S.	

== Bare knuckle record ==
Professional record breakdown
3 matches	3 wins	0 losses
By knockout	0	0
By decision	3	0
By disqualification	0	0
Draws	0	

Res.	Record	Opponent	Method	Event	Date	Round	Time	Location	Notes
Win	3–0	John Dodson	Decision (split)	BKFC 95	October 17, 2026	5	2:00	Newark, New Jersey, United States	Defended the BKFC Bantamweight Championship.
Win	2–0	Michael Larrimore	Decision (unanimous)	BKFC 89	May 22, 2026	5	2:00	Thousand Palms, California, United States	Won the vacant BKFC Bantamweight Championship.
Win	1–0	Matt Guymon	Decision (unanimous)	BKFC 86	January 17, 2026	5	2:00	Uncasville, Connecticut, United States	

== See also ==
- List of world super-featherweight boxing champions

Sporting positions
Amateur boxing titles
Previous: Semajay Thomas	U.S. light welterweight champion 2012	Next: Joey Alday
Regional boxing titles
Vacant Title last held by José Pedraza	IBF-USBA junior lightweight champion September 14, 2018 – May 25, 2019; Won WBO title	Vacant Title next held by Edward Vazquez
World boxing titles
Preceded by Masayuki Ito	WBO junior lightweight champion May 25, 2019 – October 23, 2021	Succeeded by Shakur Stevenson
