= Hironori Mishiro =

American boxer (born 1994)

Personal information
- Nationality: Japanese
- Born: 三代大訓; November 13, 1994 (age 31) Matsue, Shimane, Japan
- Height: 5 ft 9.5 in (176.5 cm)
- Weight: Lightweight

Boxing career
- Stance: Orthodox

Boxing record
- Total fights: 19
- Wins: 17
- Win by KO: 6
- Losses: 1
- Draws: 1

Hironori Mishiro (born November 13, 1994) is a Japanese professional boxer who competes in the lightweight division.

== Amateur career ==
Mishiro had an amateur record of 41–16. While having no notable wins he was captain of his universities boxing team and competed in national amateur tournaments.

== Professional career ==
=== Mishiro vs. Ito ===
After a fairly average start to career including a draw and split decision win. He took a huge step up against former world champion Masayuki Ito. Mishiro jabbed well throughout preventing Ito from countering and eventually claiming the win. Though there were no knockdowns Itos eyes were puffed up from Mishiros constant jab

=== Mishiro vs. Nakazato ===
After Mishiro suffered a surprise defeat he rebounded with two decision wins. He faced fellow highly ranked Japanese lightweight Shuma Nakazato at the Korakuen Hall. Despite trailing on the scorecards after 5 rounds Mishrio jabbed his way to victory with a dominant second half display. In doing so Mishiro claimed the Japanese national lightweight belt, the first title of his career
