= Wanderson de Oliveira =

Brazilian boxer (born 1997)

Personal information
- Born: 26 March 1997 (age 29) Rio de Janeiro, Rio de Janeiro, Brazil
- Height: 1.78 m (5 ft 10 in)

Boxing career
Medal record
Men's amateur boxing
Representing Brazil
World Championships
Bronze medal – third place	2023 Tashkent	Light middleweight
South American Games
Gold medal – first place	2018 Cochabamba	Lightweight
Gold medal – first place	2022 Asunción	Light middleweight
World Military Boxing Championships
Bronze medal – third place	2021 Moscow	Light welterweight

Wanderson de Oliveira (born 26 March 1997) is a Brazilian boxer. He competed in the men's lightweight event at the 2020 Summer Olympics.

== Career ==
Born in Complexo da Maré, a favela in Rio de Janeiro, Wanderson played football until he discovered boxing. He received the nickname Sugar, due to the “crank” punches, characteristic of American boxer Sugar Ray Leonard.

He made his World Championships debut at the 2017 AIBA World Boxing Championships, where he unanimously beat Kenyan Nicholas Okoth in the initial phase. In the 2nd round, he lost to the French Sofiane Oumiha, runner-up at the Rio Olympic Games in 2016, who ended up being the champion of this tournament.

At the 2018 South American Games held in Cochabamba, Bolivia, he won a gold medal in the Lightweight (60 kg) category.

He reached the quarterfinals of the 2019 AIBA World Boxing Championships held in Russia, in the Light welterweight category.

At the 2020 Summer Olympics held in Tokyo, Japan, he reached the quarterfinals, being eliminated by cuban Andy Cruz, who ended up as 2020 Olympic champion.

At the 2021 World Military Boxing Championship held in Moscow, Russia, Wanderson de Oliveira reached the semifinals of the -64 kg category, where he was defeated by Belarusian Dzmitry Asanau and took the bronze medal.

At the 2021 AIBA World Boxing Championships held in Belgrade, Serbia, he reached the quarterfinals of the welterweight category, where he lost to American Omari Jones, who ended up winning silver in this tournament.

At the 2022 South American Games held in Asunción, Paraguay, he won his second title, now in the light middleweight category.

At the 2023 IBA World Boxing Championships held in Tashkent, Uzbekistan, Wanderson de Oliveira was defeated by Uzbek Saidjamshid Jafarov in the semi-final of the light-middleweight category (-71 kg), obtaining the bronze medal.

At the 2023 Pan American Games, where he participated in this competition for the first time, he was surprised in the first round by Ecuadorian José Gabriel Tenório, being eliminated in the round of 16.
