= Boxing at the 2019 Pan American Games – Men's 64 kg =

Men's Light welterweight at the 2019 Pan American Games
- Venue: Miguel Grau Coliseum
- Dates: July 27– August 2, 2019
- Competitors: 9 from 9 nations

Medalists
Gold medal	Andy Cruz; Cuba
Silver medal	Keyshawn Davis; United States
Bronze medal	Alston Ryan; Antigua and Barbuda
Bronze medal	Michael Alexander; Trinidad and Tobago

The Men's light welterweight competition of the boxing events at the 2019 Pan American Games in Lima, Peru, was held between the 27 of July and the 2 of August 2019 at the Miguel Grau Coliseum.

Like all Pan American boxing events, the competition is a straight single-elimination tournament. Both semifinal losers are awarded bronze medals, so no boxers compete again after their first loss. Bouts consist of a 3 rounds "10-point must" scoring system used in the pro game, where the winner of each round must be awarded 10 points and the loser a lesser amount, and the elimination of the padded headgear. Five judges scored each bout. The winner will be the boxer who scored the most at the end of the match.

== Results ==
=== Bracket ===
Preliminaries; July 27, 2019
Miguel Ferrín (COL)	2
Hendri Cedeño (DOM)	3

Quarterfinals; July 29, 2019
Andy Cruz (CUB)	5
Hendri Cedeño (DOM)	0
Miguel German (PER)	1
Alston Ryan (ANT)	4
Eduardo Sánchez (CRC)	1
Michael Alexander (TRI)	3
Luis Arcon (VEN)
Keyshawn Davis (USA)	WO

Semifinals; July 30, 2019
Andy Cruz (CUB)	5
Alston Ryan (ANT)	0
Michael Alexander (TRI)	0
Keyshawn Davis (USA)	5

Finals; August 2, 2019
Andy Cruz (CUB)	4
Keyshawn Davis (USA)	1
