= Manish Kaushik (boxer) =

Indian boxer (born 1996)

Personal information
- Nationality: Indian
- Born: 11 January 1996 (age 30) Devsar, Bhiwani district, Haryana, India
- Height: 172 cm (5 ft 8 in)
- Weight: 63 kg (139 lb)

Boxing career
Medal record
Men's amateur boxing
Representing India
World Championships
Bronze medal – third place	2019 Yekaterinburg	Light-welterweight
Commonwealth Games
Silver medal – second place	2018 Gold Coast	Lightweight

Subedar Manish Kaushik (born 11 January 1996) is an Indian boxer who completes in the lightweight division. Manish fights out of Devsar, a village in the Bhiwani district of Haryana.

Kaushik won the gold medal at the Doha International Boxing Tournament, in his first international appearance. Two years later, Manish won gold at the 2017 National Boxing Games. Manish Kaushik later went to represent India in 2018 Commonwealth Games, winning the silver medal. Manish Kaushik won abronze in the 63 kg category at AIBA Boxing World Championship 2019. He represented India in the lightweight division in the 2020 Summer Olympics.

Manish is a Junior Commissioned Officer (JCO) in the Indian Army.

== Early life and debut in boxing ==
Manish Kaushik was born on 11 January 1996 in Devsar village, 5 kilometers (3.1 mi) from Bhiwani, Haryana in Hindu family. His father, Somdutt Sharma, is a farmer, while his mother is a homemaker. Kaushik did his primary schooling in Devsar, Haryana and secondary schooling in Bhiwani and finally received a bachelor's degree from Govt. College of Education, Bhiwani. kaushik rose as early as 4 a.m. to balance his training and studies. In order to ensure a better life for their underprivileged family, Kaushik decided to learn boxing. In 2008, boxer Jitender Kumar participated in the 2008 Summer Olympics inspiring Manish Kaushik to pursue boxing. Kaushik succeeded in entering the Indian Army. In 2016 with his boxing credentials, Kaushik, boxing grew from an interest and passion to a career choice. Manish Kaushik became the Indian National Champion after defeating the defending champion Shiva Thapa in 2017.

== Career ==
=== BOXAM International Boxing Tournament 2021 ===
Won gold medal after defeating Denmark's Boxer

=== AIBA International Boxing Tournament 2019 ===
Won Bronze Medal

=== Commonwealth Games 2018 ===
- Won against M Alexander Trinidad and Tobago W 4–0
- Won against C French of England in the quarters, W 5–0
- Won against J McGivern of Northern Ireland in the Semi-final, W 4–1
- Lost 3–2 against Garside of Australia in the final and became silver medalist.

=== Asian Game Test Event Indonesia 2018 ===
Kaushik won gold medal in his weight category in Asian Game Test Event held in Jakarta Indonesia.

=== Kazakhstan International Boxing Tournament 2017 ===
In 2017, Kazakhstan International Boxing Tournament held in Kazakhstan, Manish Kaushik wins silver medal in his weight category.

=== Doha International Boxing Tournament 2015 ===
Kaushik won gold medal in his weight category in Doha International Boxing Tournament held in Doha, Qatar.
