= Boxing at the 2019 European Games – Men's 64 kg =

Boxing competitions

Men's light welterweight boxing at the 2019 European Games
- Venue: Uruchie Sports Palace
- Date: 23–30 June
- Competitors: 29 from 29 nations

Medalists
gold medal	Hovhannes Bachkov	Armenia
silver medal	Sofiane Oumiha	France
bronze medal	Enrico Lacruz	Netherlands
bronze medal	Luke McCormack	Great Britain

The men's light welterweight 64 kg boxing event at the 2019 European Games in Minsk was held from 23 to 30 June at the Uruchie Sports Palace.

== Results ==
Legend

- RSC — Won by referee stop contest

=== Final ===
Final; 30 June
Hovhannes Bachkov (ARM)	3
Sofiane Oumiha (FRA)	2

=== Top half ===
Round of 32; 23 June
James McGivern (IRL)	5
Michal Takács (SVK)	0
Vensan Kirkorov (BUL)	0
Alexandros Tsanikidis (GRE)	5
Ahmad Shtiwi (ISR)	4
Shpetim Bajoku (KOS)	1
Dmitri Galagoţ (MDA)	1
Lasha Guruli (GEO)	4
Haris Mešanović (BIH)	0
Tuğrulhan Erdemir (TUR)	5
Paolo Di Lerni (ITA)	5
Erik Pijetraj (CRO)	0
Bakhtiyar Gazibayov (AZE)	0
Enrico Lacruz (NED)	5

Round of 16; 25 June
Hovhannes Bachkov (ARM)	5
James McGivern (IRL)	0
Alexandros Tsanikidis (GRE)	3
Ahmad Shtiwi (ISR)	2
Lasha Guruli (GEO)	1
Tuğrulhan Erdemir (TUR)	4
Paolo Di Lerni (ITA)	2
Enrico Lacruz (NED)	3

Quarterfinals; 26 June
Hovhannes Bachkov (ARM)	5
Alexandros Tsanikidis (GRE)	0
Tuğrulhan Erdemir (TUR)	2
Enrico Lacruz (NED)	3

Semifinals; 28 June
Hovhannes Bachkov (ARM)	4
Enrico Lacruz (NED)	1

=== Bottom half ===
Round of 32; 23 June
Milán Fodor (HUN)	4
Petr Novák (CZE)	1
Vazgen Safaryants (BLR)	3
Semjon Karhanin (EST)	2
Yaroslav Khartsyz (UKR)	RSC
Fredrik Jensen (DEN)
Aleksandar Konovalov (SRB)	4
Wladislaw Baryshnik (GER)	1
Damian Durkacz (POL)	3
Johan Orozco (ESP)	0
Aleksei Mazur (RUS)	5
Ibrahima Diallo (BEL)	0

Round of 16; 25 June
Luke McCormack (GBR)	3
Milán Fodor (HUN)	2
Vazgen Safaryants (BLR)	0
Yaroslav Khartsyz (UKR)	5
Aleksandar Konovalov (SRB)	0
Damian Durkacz (POL)	5
Aleksei Mazur (RUS)	1
Sofiane Oumiha (FRA)	4

Quarterfinals; 26 June
Luke McCormack (GBR)	3
Yaroslav Khartsyz (UKR)	1
Damian Durkacz (POL)	0
Sofiane Oumiha (FRA)	5

Semifinals; 28 June
Luke McCormack (GBR)	0
Sofiane Oumiha (FRA)	5
