= Raymond Muratalla =

American boxer

Personal information
- Nickname: Danger
- Born: January 15, 1997 (age 29) West Covina, California, U.S.
- Height: 5 ft 8 in (173 cm)
- Weight: Lightweight

Boxing career
- Reach: 72 in (183 cm)
- Stance: Orthodox

Boxing record
- Total fights: 24
- Wins: 24
- Win by KO: 17

Raymond Muratalla (born January 15, 1997) is an American professional boxer. He previously held the International Boxing Federation (IBF) lightweight title from 2025 to 2026

== Professional career ==
Muratalla made his professional debut in 2016. Muratalla won his first professional titles, winning the NABF and WBO Global Lightweight titles on May 20, 2023, against Jeremia Nakathila. Muratalla defended his belts against Diego Torres on November 4, 2023.

On July 13, 2024 in Las Vegas, Muratalla defeated Tevin Farmer by unanimous decision in a 10-round lightweight bout to retain his NABF title and win the vacant NABO title.

Muratalla defeated Zaur Abdullaev by unanimous decision to win the vacant IBF interim lightweight title at Pechanga Arena in San Diego on May 10, 2025. He was subsequently elevated to full champion status on June 9, 2025, following the retirement of reigning title holder Vasiliy Lomachenko.

He made a successful first defense of the title by defeating Andy Cruz via majority decision at Fontainebleau in Las Vegas on January 24, 2026. Two of the ringside judges scored the bout 118–110 and 116–112 respectively in his favour, while the third had it a 114–114 draw.

In his second defense, Muratalla defeated Robson Conceição by unanimous decision at The Theater at Virgin Hotels in Las Vegas on August 1, 2026.

== Professional boxing record ==
25 fights	25 wins	0 losses
By knockout	17	0
By decision	8	0

No.	Result	Record	Opponent	Type	Round, time	Date	Location	Notes
25	Win	25–0	Robson Conceição	UD	12	Aug 1, 2026	The Theater at Virgin Hotels, Las Vegas, Nevada, U.S.	Retained IBF lightweight title
24	Win	24–0	Andy Cruz	MD	12	Jan 24, 2026	Fontainebleau Las Vegas, Las Vegas, Nevada, U.S.	Retained IBF lightweight title
23	Win	23–0	Zaur Abdullaev	UD	12	May 10, 2025	Pechanga Arena, San Diego, California, U.S.	Won vacant IBF interim lightweight title
22	Win	22–0	Jesus Antonio Perez Campos	TKO	2 (10), 1:45	Nov 2, 2024	Turning Stone Resort & Casino, Verona, New York, U.S.	
21	Win	21–0	Tevin Farmer	UD	10	Jul 13, 2024	Palms Casino Resort, Paradise, Nevada, U.S.	Retained WBC–NABF lightweight title; Won vacant WBO–NABO lightweight title
20	Win	20–0	Xolisani Ndongeni	UD	10	Mar 29, 2024	Desert Diamond Arena, Glendale, Arizona, U.S.	
19	Win	19–0	Diego Torres Nunez	TKO	8 (10), 1:45	Nov 04, 2023	Tahoe Blue Event Center, Lake Tahoe, Nevada, U.S.	Retained WBC–NABF and WBO Global lightweight titles
18	Win	18–0	Jeremia Nakathila	TKO	2 (10), 2:48	May 20, 2023	MGM Grand, Paradise, Nevada, U.S.	Won vacant WBC–NABF and WBO Global lightweight titles
17	Win	17–0	Humberto Galindo	KO	9 (10), 2:40	Mar 25, 2023	Save Mart Center, Fresno, California, U.S.	
16	Win	16–0	Miguel Contreras	TKO	6 (8), 2:23	Nov 12, 2022	Palms Casino Resort, Paradise, Nevada, U.S.	
15	Win	15–0	Jair Valtierra	UD	8	Jul 15, 2022	Pechanga Resort & Casino, Temecula, California, U.S.	
14	Win	14–0	Jeremy Hill	KO	3 (8), 2:27	Apr 30, 2022	MGM Grand Garden Arena, Paradise, Nevada, U.S.	
13	Win	13–0	Elias Damian Araujo	TKO	5 (8), 2:20	Nov 20, 2021	Mandalay Bay, Paradise, Nevada U.S.	
12	Win	12–0	Jose Gallegos	TKO	5 (8), 1:40	May 22, 2021	Virgin Hotels Las Vegas, Paradise, Nevada, U.S.	
11	Win	11–0	Luis Porozo	TKO	3 (6), 2:40	Nov 14, 2020	MGM Grand Las Vegas, Paradise, Nevada, U.S.	
10	Win	10–0	Cesar Alan Valenzuela Zatarain	TKO	7 (8), 2:24	Aug 29, 2020	MGM Grand Las Vegas, Paradise, Nevada, U.S.	
9	Win	9–0	Arnulfo Becerra	KO	5 (6), 0:51	Nov 02, 2019	Dignity Health Sports Park, Carson, California, U.S.	
8	Win	8–0	Agustine Mauras	RTD	1 (6), 3:00	Jun 28, 2019	Pechanga Resort & Casino, Temecula, California, U.S.	
7	Win	7–0	Jose Cen Torres	KO	3 (6), 2:58	Apr 20, 2019	Dignity Health Sports Park, Carson, California, U.S.	
6	Win	6–0	Nicolas Atilio Velazquez	KO	2 (4), 1:37	Jan 18, 2019	Club Events Center, San Bernardino, California, U.S.	
5	Win	5–0	Guillaume Lorenzo	UD	4	Aug 10, 2018	Belasco Theatre, Los Angeles, California, U.S.	
4	Win	4–0	Benjamin Da Cunha	UD	4	May 17, 2018	Fantasy Springs Casino, Indio, California, U.S.	
3	Win	3–0	Javier Meraz	TKO	1 (4), 2:38	May 11, 2017	Escape Bar, Tijuana, Mexico	
2	Win	2–0	Jorge Luis Lopez	TKO	1 (4), 2:04	Nov 18, 2016	Palenque del Parque Morelos, Tijuana, Mexico	
1	Win	1–0	Jesus Sandoval	TKO	1 (4), 2:51	Sep 16, 2016	Plaza de Toros Caliente, Tijuana, Mexico	

== See also ==
- List of male boxers
- List of world lightweight boxing champions

Sporting positions
Regional boxing titles
Vacant Title last held by Francesco Patera	WBO Global lightweight champion May 20, 2023 – 2024; Vacated	Vacant Title next held by Christopher Mouafo
Vacant Title last held by Ivan Jimenez	NABF lightweight champion May 20, 2023 – 2024; Vacated	Vacant Title next held by Abdullah Mason
Vacant Title last held by Angel Fierro	NABO lightweight champion July 13, 2024 – 2025; Vacated	Vacant Title next held by Abdullah Mason
World boxing titles
Vacant Title last held by Julio Díaz	IBF lightweight champion Interim title May 10, 2025 – June 9, 2025; Promoted	Vacant
Preceded by Vasiliy Lomachenko; Retired	IBF lightweight champion June 9, 2025 – September 2, 2026; Vacated	Vacant
