= Willi Kaltschmitt Luján =

Guatemalan businessman, sports administrator, and ambassador

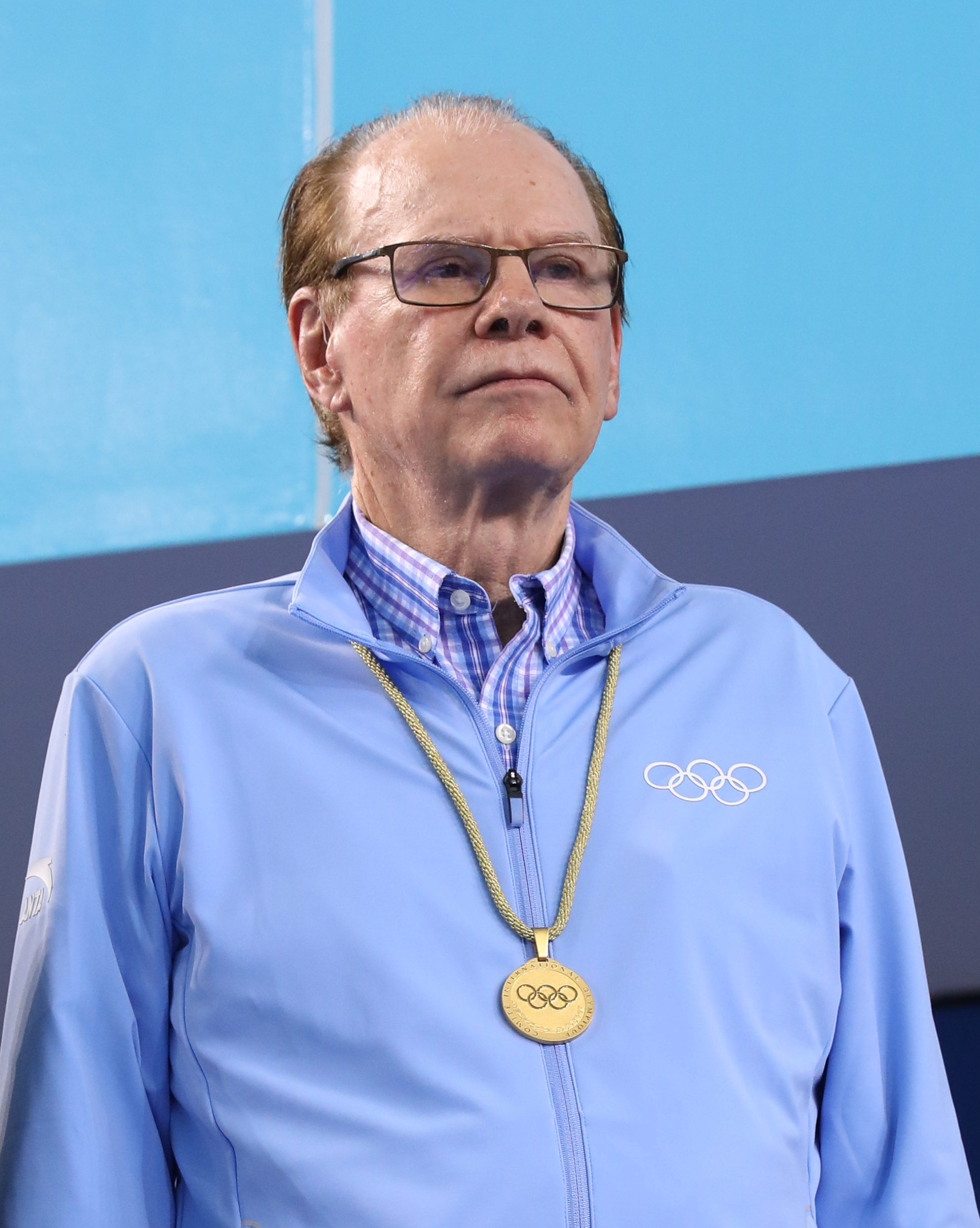
Willi Kaltschmitt Luján during the 2018 Summer Youth Olympics.

Willi Kaltschmitt Luján (born 13 August 1939) is a Guatemalan businessman, sports administrator, and former ambassador.

He was ambassador to Cuba from 1998 to 2000.

He was a member of the executive board of the International Olympic Committee (IOC) since 2012 and became an IOC Honorary Member at the end of 2019, as per protocol, as he turned 80 during the year.

He is also a member of the World Baseball Softball Confederation executive board.
