= Gabil Mamedov =

Russian boxer (born 1994)

Personal information
- National team: Russia
- Born: 19 April 1994 (age 32) Orenburg, Russia

Sport
- Sport: Boxing
Medal record
Men's amateur boxing
Representing Russia
European Games
Silver medal – second place	2019 Minsk	Lightweight
European Championships
Gold medal – first place	2024 Belgrade	Light welterweight
Silver medal – second place	2017 Kharkiv	Lightweight
Silver medal – second place	2019 Minsk	Lightweight

Gabil Abil ogly Mamedov (Russian: Габил Абил оглы Мамедов; born 19 April 1994) is a Russian boxer of Azerbaijani origin. He competed in the men's lightweight event at the 2020 Summer Olympics.

== Sports results ==
=== Amateur career ===
Gabil Mamedov has repeatedly won medals at various Russian national and international tournaments:

- 2011 — Russian Junior Championships (17–18 years), Orenburg — 1st place
- 2011 — European Junior Championships, Dublin, Ireland — 2nd place
- 2012 — Russian Junior Championships (17–18 years), Kemerovo — 2nd place
- 2013 — Russian Youth Championships (19–22 years), Orenburg — 2nd place
- 2014 — Russian Youth Championships (19–22 years), Elista — 2nd place
- 2014 — Russian Championships, Rostov-on-Don — 3rd place
- 2014 — Russian Ministry of Internal Affairs Championships, Perm — 1st place
- 2015 — Russian Youth Championships (19–22 years), Kemerovo — 3rd place
- 2015 — Russian Championships, Samara — 3rd place
- 2016 — Volga Federal District Championships — 1st place
- 2016 — Russian Championships, Orenburg — 1st place
- 2017 — International Tournament “Strandja Cup”, Sofia, Bulgaria — 2nd place
- 2017 — European Championships, Kharkiv, Ukraine — 2nd place
- 2018 — Russian Boxing Championships — 2nd place
- 2019 — Russian Boxing Championships — 1st place
- 2020 — Russian Boxing Championships — 1st place
- 2022 — Russian Boxing Championships — 1st place
- 2024 — Russian Boxing Cup — 1st place
