= Alston Ryan =

Antigua and Barbuda boxer

Personal information
- Full name: Alston Conrad S. Ryan
- Nationality: Antigua and Barbuda
- Born: 9 October 1993 (age 32)

Sport
- Sport: Boxing
Medal record
Men's amateur boxing
Representing Antigua and Barbuda
Pan American Games
Bronze medal – third place	2019 Lima	Men's 64 kg

Alston Conrad S. Ryan (born 9 October 1993) is an Antigua and Barbuda boxer. He competed in the men's lightweight event at the 2020 Summer Olympics.
