= Luke McCormack (boxer) =

English boxer (born 1995)

Personal information
- Nationality: British
- Born: 8 June 1995 (age 31) Washington, Tyne & Wear, England
- Height: 5 ft 9 1/2 in (177 cm)
- Weight: Light-welterweight

Boxing career

Boxing record
- Total fights: 6
- Wins: 6
- Win by KO: 4
Medal record
Men's amateur boxing
Representing Great Britain
European Games
Bronze medal – third place	2019 Minsk	Light welterweight
Representing England
European Championships
Silver medal – second place	2017 Kharkiv	Light welterweight
EU Championships
Gold medal – first place	2018 Valladolid	Light welterweight
Commonwealth Games
Bronze medal – third place	2018 Gold Coast	Light welterweight

Luke McCormack (born 8 June 1995) is an English professional boxer. He has held the British super-lightweight title since September 2026.

== Amateur career ==
McCormack won a silver medal at the 2017 European Amateur Boxing Championships. In May 2019, he was selected to compete at the 2019 European Games in Minsk, Belarus. He also competed at the 2019 World Championships in Yekaterinburg, Russia, where he lost by split decision (3:2) to Leonel de los Santos in the third round. He represented Great Britain at the delayed 2020 Summer Olympics, losing in the round-of-16 to eventual gold medalist Andy Cruz from Cuba.

== Professional career ==
McCormack knocked out Kay Prospere in the 10th round to win the vacant British super-lightweight title at bp pulse LIVE in Birmingham on 26 September 2026.

== Personal life ==
He is the twin brother of fellow boxer Pat McCormack.

== Professional boxing record ==
6 fights	6 wins	0 losses
By knockout	4	0
By decision	2	0

No.	Result	Record	Opponent	Type	Round, time	Date	Location	Notes
6	Win	6–0	Kay Prospere	KO	10 (12), 1:28	26 Sep 2026	bp pulse LIVE, Birmingham, England	Won vacant British super-lightweight title
5	Win	5–0	Kane Gardner	UD	10	28 Feb 2026	Vaillant Live, Derby, England	
4	Win	4–0	Samir Cuentas	TKO	2 (8), 2:51	24 May 2025	OVO Hydro, Glasgow, Scotland	
3	Win	3–0	Ramiro Garcia Lopez	PTS	6	1 Mar 2025	Bournemouth International Centre, Bournemouth, England	
2	Win	2–0	Petr Brodsky	TKO	2 (6), 2:08	6 Sept 2024	York Hall, Bethnal Green, London, England	
1	Win	1–0	Robin Zamora	KO	2 (6), 0:15	22 Mar 2024	York Hall, Bethnal Green, London, England	
