= Michael Alexander (Trinidadian boxer) =

Trinidad and Tobago boxer (born 1993)

Personal information
- Born: 28 March 1993 (age 33)

Sport
- Sport: Boxing
- Weight class: Lightweight
Medal record
Men's amateur boxing
Representing Trinidad and Tobago
Pan American Games
Bronze medal – third place	2019 Lima	Light welterweight
Central American and Caribbean Games
Silver medal – second place	2018 Barranquilla	Lightweight
Bronze medal – third place	2014 Veracruz	Lightweight
Commonwealth Games
Bronze medal – third place	2014 Glasgow	Lightweight

Michael Alexander (born 28 March 1993) is a 60 kg boxer from Port of Spain, Trinidad. He won a bronze medal at the Pan American Championships in 2013, bronze at the 2014 Commonwealth Games in Glasgow, Scotland, and a third bronze at the 2014 Central American and Caribbean Games in Veracruz, Mexico.

Alexander won a silver medal at the 2018 Central American and Caribbean Games in Barranquilla, Colombia. Michael Alexander is the father of Aiden Henrry Ishmael Alexander who was born on the 12th of October 2012 to Michael's first wife Sonia Reid when they were only 18 years old; Subsequently, the two divorced and both went their separate ways. In 2019 he Won Bronze at the Pan American Games in Lima Peru.He was coached by Reynold Cox
