= Eyurkenia Duverger =

Cuban weightlifter (born 1999)

Personal information
- Nationality: Cuba
- Born: 4 October 1999 (age 25)

Sport
- Sport: Weightlifting

Eyurkenia Duverger Pileta (born 4 October 1999) is a Cuban weightlifter. She competed at the 2020 Summer Olympics held in Tokyo, Japan, where she finished ninth in the +87 kilograms division. In her first snatch attempt at the Olympics, she lifted 96 kg in the snatch, but failed to lift in the next two attempts 100 kg, a weight she had previously lifted in other events.
