= Devsar, Bhiwani =

Devsar
- Village
- Location in Haryana, India Devsar (India)
- Coordinates: 28.760°N 76.087°E
- Country: India
- State: Haryana
- District: Bhiwani
- Mandal: Bhiwani

Government
  - Body: Village panchayat

Population (2011)
  - Total: 12,488

Languages
  - Official: Hindi
- Time zone: UTC+5:30 (IST)

Devsar is a village in the Bhiwani district of the Indian state of Haryana. It lies approximately 7 kilometres (4.3 mi) south west of the district headquarters town of Bhiwani. As of the 2011 Census of India, the village had 2,351 households with a total population of 12,488 of which 6,603 were male and 5,885 female.
