= Hovhannes Bachkov =

Armenian amateur boxer

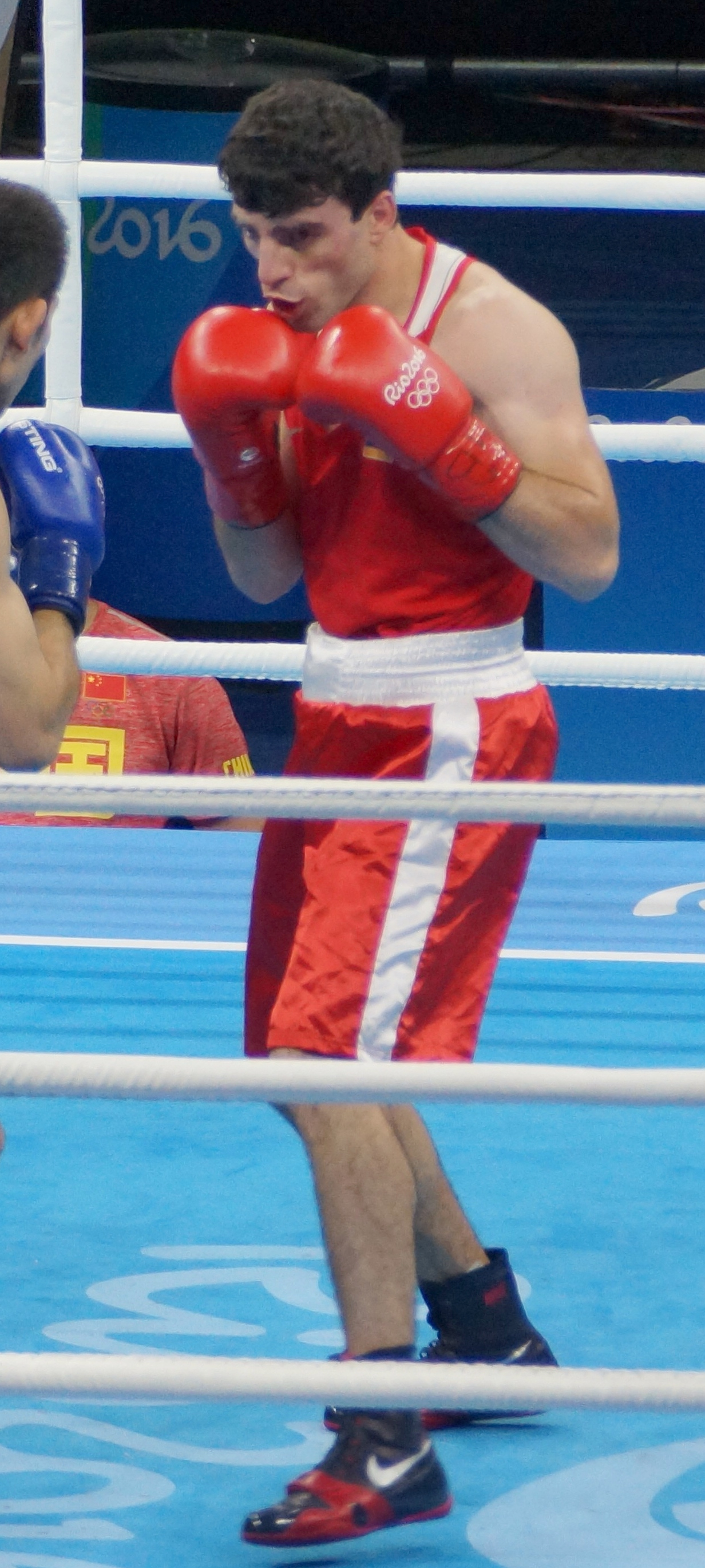
- Bachkov at the 2016 Summer Olympics

Personal information
- Born: 2 December 1992 (age 33) Gyumri, Armenia
- Height: 173 cm (5 ft 8 in)
- Weight: 64 kg (141 lb)

Boxing career
- Weight class: Lightweight, Light welterweight
Medal record
Men's amateur boxing
Representing Armenia
Olympic Games
Bronze medal – third place	2020 Tokyo	Lightweight
IBA World Championships
Bronze medal – third place	2017 Hamburg	Light welterweight
Bronze medal – third place	2019 Yekaterinburg	Light welterweight
Bronze medal – third place	2021 Belgrade	Light welterweight
Bronze medal – third place	2023 Tashkent	Light welterweight
Bronze medal – third place	2025 Dubai	Welterweight
European Games
Gold medal – first place	2019 Minsk	Light welterweight
European Championships
Gold medal – first place	2017 Kharkiv	Light welterweight
Gold medal – first place	2022 Yerevan	Light welterweight

Hovhannes Bachkov (born 2 December 1992) is an Armenian amateur boxer. He competed in the light-welterweight division at the 2016 Summer Olympics, but was eliminated in the second bout. He won the bronze medal at the 2020 Summer Olympics in Tokyo.
