= Leonel de los Santos =

Dominican Republic boxer (born 1994)

Personal information
- Full name: Leonel de los Santos Núñez
- Nationality: Dominican
- Born: December 14, 1994 (age 31) Santo Domingo, Dominican Republic

Sport
- Sport: Boxing
- Weight class: Lightweight
Medal record
Representing Dominican Republic
Pan American Games
| Silver medal – second place | 2019 Lima | Lightweight |
Pan American Championship
| Gold medal – first place | 2017 Tegucigalpa | Lightweight |

Leonel de los Santos Nunez (born December 14, 1994) is a boxer from the Dominican Republic. He competed at the 2016 Summer Olympics in the men's flyweight event, where he was eliminated in the round of 32.

He also represented the Dominican Republic at the 2020 Summer Olympics.
