= Zakir Safiullin =

Kazakhstani boxer (born 1986)

Personal information
- Full name: Zakir Nailevich Safiullin
- Born: 11 November 1986 (age 39) Shymkent, Kazakhstan

Sport
- Country: Kazakhstan
- Sport: Boxing

Zakir Nailevich Safiullin (Закир Наильевич Сафиуллин, born 11 November 1986) is a Kazakhstani boxer. He competed in the men's lightweight event at the 2020 Summer Olympics. Safiullin is of Tatar descent.
