= 2019 AIBA World Boxing Championships =

Boxing competitions

- Venue: Ekaterinburg Expo
- Location: Yekaterinburg, Russia
- Dates: 9–21 September
- Competitors: 365 from 78 nations

The 2019 AIBA World Boxing Championships were held in Yekaterinburg, Russia from 9 to 21 September 2019.

Weight classes have been adjusted to match those confirmed for the 2020 Olympic boxing tournament.

== Medal summary ==
=== Medal table ===
* Host nation (Russia)

| Rank | Nation | Gold | Silver | Bronze | Total |
|---|---|---|---|---|---|
| 1 | Uzbekistan | 3 | 1 | 1 | 5 |
| 2 | Russia* | 3 | 0 | 1 | 4 |
| 3 | Kazakhstan | 1 | 1 | 4 | 6 |
| 4 | Cuba | 1 | 1 | 1 | 3 |
| 5 | England | 0 | 1 | 2 | 3 |
| 6 | India | 0 | 1 | 1 | 2 |
| 7 | Ecuador | 0 | 1 | 0 | 1 |
| 7 | Philippines | 0 | 1 | 0 | 1 |
| 7 | United States | 0 | 1 | 0 | 1 |
| 10 | Armenia | 0 | 0 | 1 | 1 |
| 10 | Australia | 0 | 0 | 1 | 1 |
| 10 | Brazil | 0 | 0 | 1 | 1 |
| 10 | Bulgaria | 0 | 0 | 1 | 1 |
| 10 | France | 0 | 0 | 1 | 1 |
| 10 | Mongolia | 0 | 0 | 1 | 1 |
| Totals (15 entries) | | 8 | 8 | 16 | 32 |

=== Medal events ===
| Event | Gold | Silver | Bronze |
|---|---|---|---|
| Flyweight | Shakhobidin Zoirov; Uzbekistan | Amit Panghal; India | Billal Bennama; France |
| Flyweight | Shakhobidin Zoirov; Uzbekistan | Amit Panghal; India | Saken Bibossinov; Kazakhstan |
| Featherweight | Mirazizbek Mirzakhalilov; Uzbekistan | Lázaro Álvarez; Cuba | Erdenebatyn Tsendbaatar; Mongolia |
| Featherweight | Mirazizbek Mirzakhalilov; Uzbekistan | Lázaro Álvarez; Cuba | Peter McGrail; England |
| Light welterweight | Andy Cruz; Cuba | Keyshawn Davis; United States | Manish Kaushik; India |
| Light welterweight | Andy Cruz; Cuba | Keyshawn Davis; United States | Hovhannes Bachkov; Armenia |
| Welterweight | Andrey Zamkovoy; Russia | Pat McCormack; England | Ablaikhan Zhussupov; Kazakhstan |
| Welterweight | Andrey Zamkovoy; Russia | Pat McCormack; England | Bobo-Usmon Baturov; Uzbekistan |
| Middleweight | Gleb Bakshi; Russia | Eumir Marcial; Philippines | Hebert Conceição; Brazil |
| Middleweight | Gleb Bakshi; Russia | Eumir Marcial; Philippines | Tursynbay Kulakhmet; Kazakhstan |
| Light heavyweight | Bekzad Nurdauletov; Kazakhstan | Dilshodbek Ruzmetov; Uzbekistan | Julio César La Cruz; Cuba |
| Light heavyweight | Bekzad Nurdauletov; Kazakhstan | Dilshodbek Ruzmetov; Uzbekistan | Benjamin Whittaker; England |
| Heavyweight | Muslim Gadzhimagomedov; Russia | Julio Castillo; Ecuador | Radoslav Pantaleev; Bulgaria |
| Heavyweight | Muslim Gadzhimagomedov; Russia | Julio Castillo; Ecuador | Vassiliy Levit; Kazakhstan |
| Super heavyweight | Bakhodir Jalolov; Uzbekistan | Kamshybek Kunkabayev; Kazakhstan | Maksim Babanin; Russia |
| Super heavyweight | Bakhodir Jalolov; Uzbekistan | Kamshybek Kunkabayev; Kazakhstan | Justis Huni; Australia |
