= Lightweight =

Weight class in combat sports

Lightweight is a weight class in combat sports and rowing.

== Boxing ==
=== Professional boxing ===
The lightweight division is over 130 pounds (59 kilograms) and up to 135 pounds (61.2 kilograms) weight class in the sport of boxing. Notable lightweight boxers include Henry Armstrong, Ken Buchanan, Tony Canzoneri, Pedro Carrasco, Joel Casamayor, Al "Bummy" Davis, Oscar De La Hoya, Roberto Durán, Joe Gans, Artur Grigorian, Benny Leonard, Ray Mancini, Floyd Mayweather Jr., Juan Manuel Márquez, Sugar Shane Mosley, Miguel Ángel González, Carlos Ortiz, Katie Taylor, Edwin Valero, Len Wickwar, Pernell Whitaker, Manny Pacquiao and Ike Williams.

==== Current world champions ====
| Sanctioning body | Reign began | Champion | Record | Defenses |
|---|---|---|---|---|
| WBA | Oct 10, 2026 | Floyd Schofield | 20–0 (13 KO) | 0 |
| WBC | Aug 1, 2026 | William Zepeda | 34–1 (27 KO) | 0 |
| IBF | June 9, 2025 | Raymond Muratalla | 24–0 (17 KO) | 2 |
| WBO | November 22, 2025 | Abdullah Mason | 20–0 (17 KO) | 0 |

==== Current world rankings ====
===== The Ring =====
As of February 1, 2026.

Keys:

C Current The Ring world champion

| Rank | Name | Record | Title(s) |
|---|---|---|---|
| C | vacant | | |
| 1 | Shakur Stevenson | 25–0 (11 KO) | WBC |
| 2 | Raymond Muratalla | 24–0 (17 KO) | IBF |
| 3 | Gervonta Davis | 30–0–1 (28 KO) | WBA |
| 4 | William Zepeda | 33–1 (27 KO) | |
| 5 | Andy Cruz | 6–1 (3 KO) | |
| 6 | Abdullah Mason | 20–0 (17 KO) | WBO |
| 7 | Floyd Schofield | 19–0 (13 KO) | |
| 8 | Denys Berinchyk | 19–1 (9 KO) | |
| 9 | Sam Noakes | 17–1 (15 KO) | |
| 10 | Lucas Bahdi | 20–0 (15 KO) | |

===== BoxRec =====
As of May 19, 2025.

| Rank | Name | Record | Title(s) |
|---|---|---|---|
| 1 | Gervonta Davis | 30–0–1 (28 KO) | WBA |
| 2 | Shakur Stevenson | 23–0 (11 KO) | WBC |
| 3 | Raymond Muratalla | 23–0 (17 KO) | |
| 4 | William Zepeda Segura | 33-0 (27 KO) | |
| 5 | Keyshawn Davis | 13–0–0–1 (9 KO) | |
| 6 | Lamont Roach Jr. | 25–1–2 (10 KO) | |
| 7 | Zaur Abdullaev | 20–2 (12 KO) | |
| 8 | Sam Noakes | 17–0 (15 KO) | |
| 9 | Abdullah Mason | 20–0 (17 KO) | |
| 10 | Jadier Herrera | 17–0 (15 KO) | |

==== Longest reigning world lightweight champions ====
Below is a list of "longest reigning lightweight champions" career time as champion (for multiple time champions) does not apply.

| | Name | Title Reign | Title recognition | Successful defenses | Beaten opponents | Fights |
|---|---|---|---|---|---|---|
| 1. | Benny Leonard | 7 years, 7 months, 17 days | World | 6 | 6 | |
| 2. | Artur Grigorian | 7 years, 6 months, 20 days | WBO | 17 | 17 | |
| 3. | Jack McAuliffe | 6 years, 7 months, 12 days | World | 7 | 6 | |
| 4. | Roberto Durán | 6 years, 7 months, 5 days | WBA, WBC | 12 | 11 | |
| 5. | Ike Williams | 6 years, 1 month, 7 days | World | 8 | 6 | |
| 6. | Joe Gans | 6 years, 27 days | World | 15 | 13 | |
| 7. | Joe Brown | 5 years, 7 months, 27 days | World | 11 | 10 | |
| 8. | Devin Haney | 4 years, 1 month, 7 days | WBA, WBC, IBF, WBO | 7 | 6 | |
| 9. | Miguel Vazquez | 4 years, 29 days | IBF | 6 | 6 | |
| 10. | Sammy Mandell | 4 years, 14 days | NBA | 4 | 4 | |
| 11. | Paul Spadafora | 3 years, 10 months | IBF | 8 | 8 | |

=== Amateur boxing ===
==== Olympic Champions ====
===== Men's =====
- 1904 – Harry Spanger (USA)
- 1908 – Frederick Grace (GBR)
- 1920 – Samuel Mosberg (USA)
- 1924 – Hans Jacob Nielsen (DEN)
- 1928 – Carlo Orlandi (ITA)
- 1952 – Aureliano Bolognesi (ITA)
- 1956 – Dick McTaggart (GBR)
- 1960 – Kazimierz Paździor (POL)
- 1964 – Józef Grudzień (POL)
- 1968 – Ronnie Harris (USA)
- 1972 – Jan Szczepański (POL)
- 1976 – Howard Davis Jr. (USA)
- 1980 – Ángel Herrera (CUB)
- 1984 – Pernell Whitaker (USA)
- 1988 – Andreas Zülow (GDR)
- 1992 – Oscar De La Hoya (USA)
- 1996 – Hocine Soltani (ALG)
- 2000 – Mario César Kindelán Mesa (CUB)
- 2004 – Mario César Kindelán Mesa (CUB)
- 2008 – Aleksei Tishchenko (RUS)
- 2012 – Vasiliy Lomachenko (UKR)
- 2016 – Robson Conceição (BRA)
- 2020 – Andy Cruz (CUB)

==== Pan American Champions ====
- 1951 – (Argentina) Oscar Gallardo (ARG)
- 1955 – (Argentina) Miguel Ángel Péndola (ARG)
- 1959 – (Argentina) Abel Laudonio (ARG)
- 1963 – (Cuba) Roberto Caminero (CUB)
- 1967 – (Cuba) Enrique Regueiferos (CUB)
- 1971 – (Puerto Rico) Luis Dávila (PUR)
- 1975 – (Canada) Chris Clarke (CAN)
- 1979 – (Cuba) Adolfo Horta (CUB)
- 1983 – (United States) Pernell Whitaker (USA)
- 1987 – (Cuba) Julio Gonzáles (CUB)
- 1991 – (Cuba) Julio Gonzáles (CUB)
- 1995 – (Cuba) Julio Gonzáles (CUB)
- 1999 – (Cuba) Mario César Kindelán Mesa (CUB)
- 2003 – (Cuba) Mario César Kindelán Mesa (CUB)
- 2007 – (Cuba) Yordenis Ugás (CUB)
- 2011 – (Cuba) Yasniel Toledo (CUB)

== Kickboxing ==
International Kickboxing Federation (IKF) Lightweight (Pro & Amateur) 127.1 lb - 132 lb or 57.77 kg - 60 kg. Women's divisions also use this weight class, but usually at a lower weight than the men's divisions. In Glory promotion, a lightweight division is up to 70 kg (154 lb).

In ONE Championship, the lightweight division limit is 77.1 kg (170 lb).

== Bare-knuckle boxing ==
The limit for lightweight generally differs among promotions in bare-knuckle boxing:

- In Bare Knuckle Fighting Championship, the lightweight division has an upper limit of 155 lb (70 kg).
- In BKB™, the lightweight division has an upper limit of 79 kg (174 lb).

== Lethwei ==
In World Lethwei Championship, the lightweight division has an upper limit of 60 kg (132 lb).

== Mixed martial arts ==
In MMA, the lightweight division is from 146 lb (66 kg) to 155 lb (70 kg).

== Rowing ==
At the international level, for crew boats, the limits are:

- Men: Crew average 70 kg (154.3 lb) – no rower over 72.5 kg (159.8 lb)
- Women: Crew average 57 kg (125.7 lb) – no rower over 59 kg (130.1 lb)

For single sculls, the limits are 72.5 kg (159.8 lb) for men and 59 kg (130.1 lb) for women.

Originally, lightweight rowing was an introduced as a category at the 1996 Summer Olympics, due to countries with athletes of smaller average stature competing with an unfair disadvantage, as rowing favors taller athletes who have more leverage.

Current Olympic-class lightweight events in rowing are the men's lightweight double sculls, and the women's lightweight double sculls. From 1996 to 2016, there was also the men's lightweight coxless four event.

== Sumo ==
In amateur sumo competitions sanctioned by the International Sumo Federation, the lightweight class is defined as no heavier than 85 kg (187.4 lb) for men, 80 kg (176.4 lb) for boys, 65 kg (143.3 lb) for women, and 60 kg (132.3 lb) for girls.
