= 2015 AIBA World Boxing Championships – Light welterweight =

Boxing competitions

The light welterweight competition at the 2015 AIBA World Boxing Championships was held from 6–14 October 2015. This was a qualifying tournament for the 2016 Summer Olympics. Vitaly Dunaytsev of Russia defeated Fazliddin Gaibnazarov of Uzbekistan to win the world title.

== Medalists ==
| Gold | Vitaly Dunaytsev (RUS) |
| Silver | Fazliddin Gaibnazarov (UZB) |
| Bronze | Yasniel Toledo (CUB) |
| Bronze | Wuttichai Masuk (THA) |

== Seeds ==
1. (Cuba) Yasniel Toledo (semifinals)
2. (Thailand) Wuttichai Masuk (semifinals)
3. (Italy) Vincenzo Mangiacapre (quarterfinals)
4. (Algeria) Abdelkader Chadi (round of 16)

== Draw ==
=== Finals ===
Semifinals
1 | Yasniel Toledo (CUB) | 1
4 | Vitaly Dunaytsev (RUS) | 2
3 | Fazliddin Gaibnazarov (UZB) | 3
2 | Wuttichai Masuk (THA) | 0

Final
Vitaly Dunaytsev (RUS) | 2
Fazliddin Gaibnazarov (UZB) | 1

==== Section 1 ====
Round of 32
Manoj Kumar (IND) | 1
Abdelhak Aatakni (MAR) | 2
Lim Hyun-chul (KOR) | 0
Hovhannes Bachkov (ARM) | 3
Dmitri Galagoț (MDA) | 0
Pat McCormack (GBR) | 3
Lorenzo Sotomayor (AZE) | 3
Arthur Biyarslanov (CAN) | 0

Round of 16
Yasniel Toledo (CUB) | 3
Abdelhak Aatakni (MAR) | 0
Hovhannes Bachkov (ARM) | 3
Aziz Bebitov (TKM) | 0
Vitaly Dunaytsev (RUS) | 3
Pat McCormack (GBR) | 0
Lorenzo Sotomayor (AZE) | 3
Abdelkader Chadi (ALG) | 0

Quarterfinals
Yasniel Toledo (CUB) | 3
Hovhannes Bachkov (ARM) | 0
Vitaly Dunaytsev (RUS) | 3
Lorenzo Sotomayor (AZE) | 0

Semifinals
Yasniel Toledo (CUB) | 1
Vitaly Dunaytsev (RUS) | 2

==== Section 2 ====
Round of 32
Dean Walsh (IRL) | 1
Luis Arcon Díaz (VEN) | 2
Kagiso Bagwasi (BOT) | 0
Thulasi Tharumalingam (QAT) | 3
Viktor Petrov (UKR) | 1
Danielito Zorrilla (PUR) | 2
David Biddle (AUS) | 3
Ronan Sanchez (ARG) | 0

Round of 16
Vincenzo Mangiacapre (ITA) | 3
Luis Arcon Díaz (VEN) | 0
Thulasi Tharumalingam (QAT)
Fazliddin Gaibnazarov (UZB) | TKO
Evaldas Petrauskas (LTU) | 1
Danielito Zorrilla (PUR) | 2
David Biddle (AUS) | 0
Wuttichai Masuk (THA) | 3

Quarterfinals
Vincenzo Mangiacapre (ITA) | 0
Fazliddin Gaibnazarov (UZB) | 3
Danielito Zorrilla (PUR) | 0
Wuttichai Masuk (THA) | 3

Semifinals
Fazliddin Gaibnazarov (UZB) | 3
Wuttichai Masuk (THA) | 0

== Results ==
=== Ranking ===
| Rank | Athlete |
|---|---|
| 1st place, gold medalist(s) | Vitaly Dunaytsev (RUS) |
| 2nd place, silver medalist(s) | Fazliddin Gaibnazarov (UZB) |
| 3rd place, bronze medalist(s) | Yasniel Toledo (CUB) |
| 3rd place, bronze medalist(s) | Wuttichai Masuk (THA) |
| 5 | Hovhannes Bachkov (ARM) |
| 5 | Lorenzo Sotomayor (AZE) |
| 5 | Vincenzo Mangiacapre (ITA) |
| 5 | Danielito Zorrilla (PUR) |
| 9 | Abdelkader Chadi (ALG) |
| 9 | David Biddle (AUS) |
| 9 | Pat McCormack (GBR) |
| 9 | Evaldas Petrauskas (LTU) |
| 9 | Abdelhak Aatakni (MAR) |
| 9 | Thulasi Tharumalingam (QAT) |
| 9 | Aziz Bebitov (TKM) |
| 9 | Luis Arcon Díaz (VEN) |
| 17 | Ronan Sanchez (ARG) |
| 17 | Kagiso Bagwasi (BOT) |
| 17 | Arthur Biyarslanov (CAN) |
| 17 | Manoj Kumar (IND) |
| 17 | Dean Walsh (IRL) |
| 17 | Lim Hyun-chul (KOR) |
| 17 | Dmitri Galagoț (MDA) |
| 17 | Viktor Petrov (UKR) |
