= Fazliddin Gaibnazarov =

Uzbekistani boxer (born 1991)

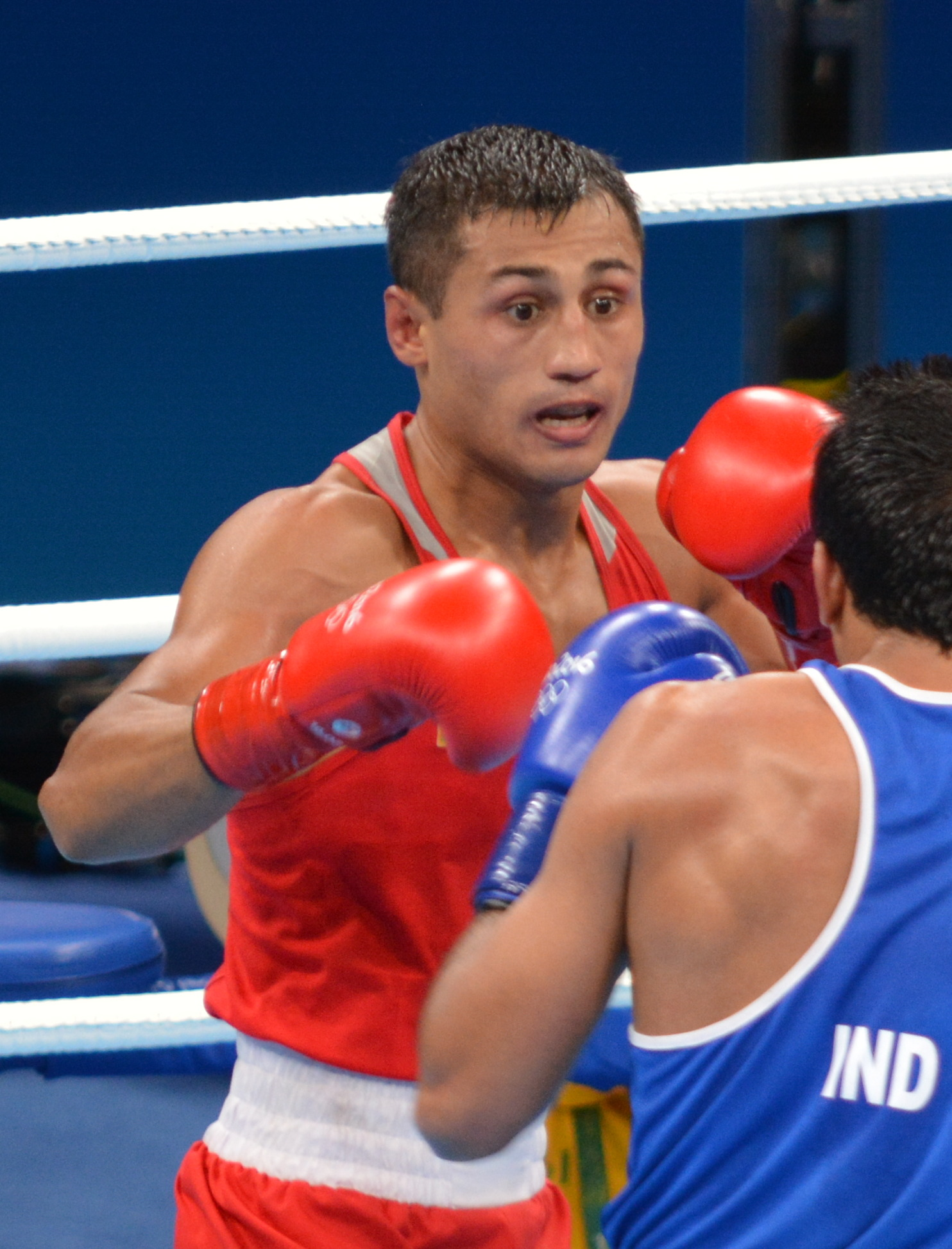
- Gaibnazarov at the 2016 Olympics

Personal information
- Nationality: Uzbekistan
- Born: Fazliddin Hasanbaevich Gaibnazarov; 16 June 1991 (age 35) Bekabad, Uzbek SSR, Soviet Union
- Height: 169 cm (5 ft 7 in)
- Weight: Light welterweight; Welterweight

Boxing career
- Stance: Southpaw

Boxing record
- Total fights: 13
- Wins: 11
- Win by KO: 6
- Losses: 2
Medal record
Men's amateur boxing
Representing Uzbekistan
Olympic Games
Gold medal – first place	2016 Rio de Janeiro	Light welterweight
World Championships
Silver medal – second place	2015 Doha	Light welterweight
Asian Championships
Silver medal – second place	2015 Bangkok	Light welterweight

Fazliddin Hasanbaevich Gaibnazarov (Uzbek: Fazliddin Gʻoibnazarov, born 16 June 1991) is an Uzbek professional boxer currently fighting at welterweight. As an amateur fighting at light welterweight, in 2015 he earned silver medals at the world and Asian championships, and in 2016 won a gold medal at the Rio Olympics.

== Amateur career ==
=== 2012 Olympics ===
In the round of 32, Gaibnazarov defeated Yhyacinthe Mewoli Abdon 11–6. He then beat Jose Ramírez 15–11 in the round of 16. He lost in the quarterfinals to eventual silver medalist Han Soon-Chul 13–16.

=== 2016 Olympics ===
Gaibnazarov won the gold medal in the 2016 Rio Olympics in the light welterweight division. He defeated Dival Malonga of the Republic of Congo in the round of 32, Manoj Kumar of India in the round of 16, Gary Antuanne Russell of the United States in the quarterfinals, Vitaly Dunaytsev of Russia in the semifinals, and finally Lorenzo Sotomayor Collazo of Azerbaijan in the finals to win the gold medal.

== Professional career ==
Gaibnazarov turned professional at the age of 25 when he signed with Top Rank on 17 March 2017 on a multi-year deal. Gaibnazarov, speaking to ESPN, praised Top Rank saying, "Top Rank is the best promotional company in the world, and I always want to be with the best. Thank you, Top Rank, and especially Bob Arum, for giving me this opportunity and letting me show and prove in the ring my ability to fight as a professional."

Top Rank's vice president Carl Moretti announced that Gaibnazarov would make his debut as a lightweight at the StubHub Center in Carson, California on 22 April in an 8-round bout. On his debut, he fought Victor Vazquez (7-2, 3 KOs). Gaibnazarov was dropped in the opening round after just 20 seconds. He recovered well and stopped Vazquez after 1 minute, 28 seconds of round 2. Speaking to a translator, he said, "I was a little bit hurried in the first round because it was my debut. I was maybe nervous and didn't feel comfortable. After I came to the corner, my trainers told me what to do and I followed their instructions, and you see how it came out." It was the first time Gaibnazarov had been dropped in his entire boxing career. Gaibnazarov's next fight took place 29 days later on the Terence Crawford vs. Félix Díaz undercard at Madison Square Garden in New York City against Agustine Mauras. Gaibnazarov was taken the full 8 round distance, winning on all three judges' scorecards (80-72). He threw straight lefts and right hooks throughout the 8 rounds. Gaibnazarov next appeared at the Convention Center in Tucson, Arizona on 22 September 2017 against Mexican boxer Victor Rosas (9-6, 3 KOs). Gaibnazarov applied pressure, landing clean shots, however was unable to stop Rosas, winning the bout on all three scorecards 80–72 to remain undefeated. On 12 October it was announced that he would appear on the undercard of Vasiliy Lomachenko vs. Guillermo Rigondeaux on 9 December at the Madison Square Garden Theater in New York City. Unbeaten lightweight prospect Steven Ortiz (7-0, 2 KOs) was confirmed as his opponent, however the fight did not take place. Gaibnazarov's next fight did take place on the undercard of Lomachenko, for his fight against Jorge Linares at the Madison Square Garden on 12 May 2018. His opponent was Mexican boxer Jesus Silveira. The fight ended in round 4 after Gaibnazarov dropped Silveira twice. The first knockdown came with a two-punch combination and the second came with a left hand, which he was landed clean most of the fight. The time of stoppage was 2 minutes, 5 seconds. He also became the first boxer to stop Silveira.

Gaibnarazov's fifth professional fight was set to take place at Lakefront Arena in New Orleans on 14 July 2018 against fellow undefeated American boxer Kevin Johnson (5-0, 4 KOs) in a scheduled 8-round bout. The fight was not easy as Gaibnazarov had to overcome Johnson's straight right in multiple rounds, but was the more busier throughout the fight and landed the cleaner shots. The fight went the distance with all three judges scoring the same 78-74 score for Gaibnazarov, giving him the unanimous decision win. His next fight was announced on 4 October. The card was to take place on 20 October at the Park Theater at Park MGM in Las Vegas. Gaibnazarov was scheduled to fight at welterweight against Wilberth Lopez (23-9, 15 KOs) in an eight-round bout. Gaibnazarov stopped Lopez in round 2 after 2 minutes and 13 seconds. Gaibnazarov's next fight came on 18 January 2019 against Ricardo Garcia at the Turning Stone Resort Casino in Verona, New York. He dropped his opponent once in the third round and stopped him in the fourth.

In February 2019, Top Rank announced the rematch of Miguel Berchelt vs. Francisco Vargas, which was to take place at the Tucson Arena in Arizona on 11 May 2019. The undercard was announced on 1 May, with Gaibnazarov headlining the ESPN+ preliminary card, stepping up in competition against 23 year old Mykal "The Professor" Fox (19-1, 5 KOs) in a 10-round super lightweight contest. The only loss in Fox's professional career had come against another top prospect Shohjahon Ergashev via unanimous decision. Many observers felt Fox did enough to earn a draw despite the wide scorecard. Gaibnazarov had a nine-inch height disadvantage. Gaibnazarov weighed at 141.8 pounds and Fox came in at 142 pounds. In an upset, Gaibnazarov lost his first professional bout via unanimous decision. His power was accurately minimised as Fox rightly used his height advantage. Both southpaws started the right trading on the inside. Fox came close to being knocked down in round 2 following a combination. As the fight wore on, Gaibnazarov began to feel frustrated and began to hold, which caused referee Tony Zaino to dock points off him in the sixth and seventh rounds. This defeated Gaibnazarov and boosted Fox's confidence going into the final rounds. The three judges scorecards read 96-92, 96-92 and 95-93 in favour of Fox. This was the last time Gaibnazarov would fight in the United States.

Gaibnazarov bounced back with a win in December 2019, stopping Vladyslav Baranov in the first round. The fight took place at Baluan Sholak Sports Palace in Almaty, Kazakhstan under MTK Global and was his first fight outside the United States as a professional. His next bout came a year later on 5 December 2020, making his debut in Russia against Manuk Dilanyan (11-4-1, 4 KOs) at the RCC Boxing Academy, Yekaterinburg. Gaibnazarov dropped Dilanyan with a body shot in round 3 and went on to win the fight via unanimous decision. Strangely, no scores were announced after the fight, however scores were later revealed as 79-72, 80-71 and 80-71 for Gaibnazarov. His next bout came 20 months later, fighting in his home country for the first time as a professional at the Humo Arena in Tashkent, defeating 39 year old Jaider Parra by knockout after just 38 seconds of round 1. He returned to the same arena on 2 December 2022, this time fighting fellow countryman Jamshid Karimov in a 10-round light middleweight bout. Gaibnazarov proved to be the better boxer and worked through a unanimous decision win. Two judges had the score a wide 99-91, but the third saw the contest closer, scoring it 96-94 in Gaibnazarov's favour. Gaibnazarov's next fight was scheduled to take place on 6 November 2023 against Russian boxer Radzhab Butaev (14-1, 11 KOs) at the Red Arena in Krasnaya Polyana. Butaev was coming off a split decision loss to Eimantas Stanionis earlier in the year. Gaibnazarov lost the bout after retiring in his corner following round 3. After the third, one judge had Gaibnazarov ahead 30-27 and the two remaining judges had their scores 29-28 for Butaev.

== Professional boxing record ==
13 fights	11 wins	2 losses
By knockout	6	1
By decision	5	1

No.	Result	Record	Opponent	Type	Round, time	Date	Location	Notes
13	Loss	11–2	(Russia) Radzhab Butaev	RTD	3 (10), 3:00	6 Nov 2023	Red Arena, Krasnaya Polyana, Russia	
12	Win	11–1	(Uzbekistan) Jamshid Karimov	UD	10	2 Dec 2022	Humo Arena, Tashkent, Uzbekistan	
11	Win	10–1	(Venezuela) Jaider Parra	KO	1 (10), 0:38	13 Aug 2022	Humo Arena, Tashkent, Uzbekistan	
10	Win	9–1	(Armenia) Manuk Dilanyan	UD	8	5 Dec 2020	RCC Boxing Academy, Yekaterinburg, Russia	
9	Win	8–1	(Ukraine) Vladyslav Baranov	KO	1 (8), 1:20	16 Dec 2019	Baluan Sholak Sports Palace, Almaty, Kazakhstan	
8	Loss	7–1	(United States) Mykal Fox	UD	10	11 May 2019	(United States) Convention Center, Tucson, Arizona, US	
7	Win	7–0	(Dominican Republic) Ricardo Garcia	TKO	4 (8), 1:38	18 Jan 2019	(United States) Turning Stone Resort Casino, Verona, New York, US	
6	Win	6–0	(United States) Wilberth Lopez	TKO	2 (8), 2:30	20 Oct 2018	(United States) Park MGM, Paradise, Nevada, US	
5	Win	5–0	(United States) Kevin Johnson	UD	8	14 Jul 2018	(United States) Lakefront Arena, New Orleans, Louisiana, US	
4	Win	4–0	(Mexico) Jesus Silveira	TKO	4 (8), 2:05	12 May 2018	(United States) Madison Square Garden, New York City, New York, US	
3	Win	3–0	(Mexico) Victor Rosas	UD	8	22 Sep 2017	(United States) Convention Center, Tucson, Arizona, US	
2	Win	2–0	(United States) Agustine Mauras	UD	8	20 May 2017	(United States) Madison Square Garden, New York City, New York, US	
1	Win	1–0	(United States) Victor Vazquez	KO	2 (8), 1:28	22 Apr 2017	(United States) StubHub Center, Carson, California, US	
