= Boxing at the 2015 European Games – Men's 64 kg =

Boxing competitions

Men's light welterweight boxing at the 2015 European Games
- Venue: Baku Crystal Hall
- Date: 16–26 June
- Competitors: 24 from 24 nations

Medalists
gold medal	Lorenzo Sotomayor	Azerbaijan
silver medal	Vincenzo Mangiacapre	Italy
bronze medal	Viktor Petrov	Ukraine
bronze medal	Kastriot Sopa	Germany

The men's light welterweight 64 kg boxing event at the 2015 European Games in Baku was held from 16 to 26 June at the Baku Crystal Hall.

== Results ==
=== Final ===
Final; 26 June
Vincenzo Mangiacapre (ITA)	0
Lorenzo Sotomayor (AZE)	3

=== Top half ===
Round of 32; 16–17 June
András Vadász (HUN)	0
Adem Avcı (TUR)	3
Naser Shala (KOS)	0
Hassan Amzile (FRA)	3
Kazimierz Łęgowski (POL)	0
Maxim Dadashev (RUS)	3
Irakli Melikishvili (GEO)	3
Artūrs Ahmetovs (LAT)	0

Round of 16; 21 June
Vincenzo Mangiacapre (ITA)	3
Adem Avcı (TUR)	0
Hassan Amzile (FRA)	3
Yauheni Dauhaliavets (BLR)	0
Dean Walsh (IRL)	2
Maxim Dadashev (RUS)	1
Irakli Melikishvili (GEO)	0
Kastriot Sopa (GER)	3

Quarterfinals; 23 June
Vincenzo Mangiacapre (ITA)	2
Hassan Amzile (FRA)	1
Dean Walsh (IRL)	0
Kastriot Sopa (GER)	3

Semifinals; 25 June
Vincenzo Mangiacapre (ITA)	3
Kastriot Sopa (GER)	0

=== Bottom half ===
Round of 32; 17–18 June
Clarence Goyeram (SWE)	3
Salavat Khatuev (NOR)	0
Ayrin Ismetov (BUL)	0
Viktor Petrov (UKR)	3
Daniel Niculescu (ROU)	2
Johan Orozco (ESP)	0
Lorenzo Sotomayor (AZE)	3
Edin Sejdinović (SLO)	0

Round of 16; 21 June
Samuel Maxwell (GBR)	1
Clarence Goyeram (SWE)	2
Viktor Petrov (UKR)	3
Hovhannes Bachkov (ARM)	0
Adem Fetahović (BIH)	0
Daniel Niculescu (ROU)	3
Lorenzo Sotomayor (AZE)	3
Dmitri Galagoț (MDA)	0

Quarterfinals; 23 June
Clarence Goyeram (SWE)	1
Viktor Petrov (UKR)	2
Daniel Niculescu (ROU)	0
Lorenzo Sotomayor (AZE)	3

Semifinals; 25 June
Viktor Petrov (UKR)	0
Lorenzo Sotomayor (AZE)	3
