= 2017 AIBA World Boxing Championships – Light welterweight =

Boxing competitions

Light welterweight at the 2017 AIBA World Boxing Championships
- Venue: Alsterdorfer Sporthalle
- Location: Hamburg, Germany
- Dates: 25 August–2 September
- Competitors: 24 from 24 nations

Medalists
gold medal	Andy Cruz Gómez	Cuba
silver medal	Ikboljon Kholdarov	Uzbekistan
bronze medal	Freudis Rojas	United States
bronze medal	Hovhannes Bachkov	Armenia

The Light welterweight competition at the 2017 AIBA World Boxing Championships was held from 25 August to 2 September 2017.

== Draw ==
=== Final ===
Final
2 September
(Uzbekistan) Ikboljon Kholdarov	0
(Cuba) Andy Cruz Gómez	5

=== Top half ===
First round
25 August
(Egypt) Eslam El-Gendy	3
(Kyrgyzstan) Nurlan Kobashev	2
25 August
(United States) Freudis Rojas	5
(Norway) Hadi Srour	0
25 August
(Poland) Mateusz Polski	2
(Colombia) John Gutiérrez	3
25 August
(England) Luke McCormack	4
(China) Wang Gang	1

Second round
27 August
(Azerbaijan) Lorenzo Sotomayor	2
(Egypt) Eslam El-Gendy	3
27 August
(United States) Freudis Rojas	4
(Russia) Vitaly Dunaytsev	1
27 August
(Uzbekistan) Ikboljon Kholdarov	5
(Colombia) John Gutiérrez	0
27 August
(England) Luke McCormack	0
(Germany) Artem Harutyunyan	5

Quarterfinals
29 August
(Egypt) Eslam El-Gendy	0
(United States) Freudis Rojas	5
29 August
(Uzbekistan) Ikboljon Kholdarov	3
(Germany) Artem Harutyunyan	2

Semifinals
31 August
(United States) Freudis Rojas	1
(Uzbekistan) Ikboljon Kholdarov	4

=== Bottom half ===
First round
25 August
(Sri Lanka) Dushan Saparamadu	0
(Kazakhstan) Bekdaulet Ibragimov	5
25 August
(Nauru) Colan Caleb	0
(Hungary) Richárd Kovács	5
25 August
(Lithuania) Evaldas Petrauskas	0
(Canada) Arthur Biyarslanov	5
25 August
(Brazil) Joedison de Jesus	1
(Republic of Ireland) Seán McComb	4

Second round
27 August
(Armenia) Hovhannes Bachkov	3
(Kazakhstan) Bekdaulet Ibragimov	2
27 August
(Hungary) Richárd Kovács	0
(Mongolia) Baatarsükh Chinzorig	5
27 August
(Dominican Republic) Elvis Rodriguez	3
(Canada) Arthur Biyarslanov	2
27 August
(Republic of Ireland) Seán McComb	0
(Cuba) Andy Cruz Gómez	5

Quarterfinals
29 August
(Armenia) Hovhannes Bachkov	4
(Mongolia) Baatarsükh Chinzorig	1
29 August
(Dominican Republic) Elvis Rodriguez	0
(Cuba) Andy Cruz Gómez	5

Semifinals
31 August
(Armenia) Hovhannes Bachkov	0
(Cuba) Andy Cruz Gómez	5
