= Hadi Srour =

Norwegian boxer (born 1995)

Personal information
- Nickname: The Slim Reaper
- Nationality: Norwegian
- Born: Hadi Hassan Srour; 16 November 1995 (age 30) Borgheim, Norway
- Height: 6 ft 0 in (183 cm)
- Weight: Light welterweight

Boxing career
- Stance: Orthodox

Boxing record
- Total fights: 4
- Wins: 4
- Win by KO: 2
Medal record
Men's amateur boxing
Representing Norway
Nordic Championships
Gold medal – first place	2017 Gilleleje	Light-welterweight
Gold medal – first place	2018 Oslo	Light-welterweight
Bronze medal – third place	2016 Gothenburg	Light-welterweight

Hadi Hassan Srour (born 16 November 1995) is a Norwegian professional boxer.

As an amateur, he competed at the 2017 World Championships as well as three editions of the European Championships in 2015, 2017 and 2019. He won over 100 amateur bouts, becoming a three-time Nordic champion (two senior, one youth) and a seven-time national champion (four senior, three youth).

Srour was convicted of doping in November 2020 and given the maximum sentence of a four-year ban. He is the brother of fellow boxer Ali Srour, who was sentenced to ten years and six months in prison for multiple rapes in September 2025.

== Amateur career ==
Srour initially had a love for football, but joined the TK boxing club in his hometown of Tønsberg at the age of nine with his brother Amin and cousin Ali. He competed as a youth until 2014, winning a gold medal at the 2013 Nordic Championships and three consecutive national championships at that level. In 2014, he was the lightweight national champion in both the youth and senior divisions.

In 2015, Srour lost to Salavat Khatujev in the national championship finals. He defeated Jacob Gabriel by split decision in the finals of the Haringey Box Cup in England, but then suffered a quick exit at the European Championships in Bulgaria with a first-round loss to the more experienced Florentin Niculescu. Srour repeated as a silver medallist at the national championships in 2016. He also won a bronze medal at the Nordic Championships and suffered a first-round exit in the European Olympic Qualification Tournament at the hands of Batuhan Gözgeç.

In 2017 he won his second senior national title, moving up to welterweight and defeating Ruslan Sjidokaev in the final for the gold. A few weeks later he won the light-welterweight gold medal at the Nordic Championships, where he was also won the award for best senior male athlete. However, he suffered a quarterfinal exit at the European Championships and a first-round loss to Freudis Rojas at the World Championships. He finished the year by winning the King of the Ring Tournament in Sweden, once again moving up to welterweight and knocking out Nordic champion Adolpe Sylva in the semi-finals before beating the 2016 King of the Ring, Alex Bishop, in the title fight. He was named the best boxer of the tournament. For his multiple gold-medal performances, local publication Tønsbergs Blad awarded him the Kristinastatuetten given to the Vestfold region's athlete of the year.

Srour repeated as national and Nordic champion in 2018. He won his last national title in 2019, defeating Yusof Mohammed Abid in the finals. He also competed at the European Games that summer, which doubled as the 2019 European Championships, losing in his first fight against Eskerkhan Madiev.

=== Amateur results ===
- 2011 Nordic Championships in Lahti, Finland (flyweight – youth)
  - Lost to Iyad Snounou (Denmark) 11–13 (silver)
- 2011 Pirkka Tournament in Tampere, Finland (light-flyweight – junior)
  - Defeated Dzahar Abuhanov (Finland) 5–0 (gold)
- 2011 European Junior Championships in Keszthely, Hungary (light-flyweight)
  - Lost to Vladislav Krasnoshein (Russia) 4–8
- 2012 Youth National Championships in Moss, Norway (flyweight)
  - Defeated Sahand Lahafdozzian 23–9 (gold)
- 2012 Nordic Championships in Stockholm, Sweden (flyweight – youth)
  - Defeated Roni Eho (Finland) RSC3
  - Lost to Fredrik Jensen (Denmark) 8–19 (silver)
- 2012 Pirkka Tournament in Tampere, Finland (flyweight – youth)
  - Lost to Alexey Alayev (Russia) 0–5 (bronze)
- 2012 Brandenburg Youth Cup in Frankfurt n/Oder, Germany (flyweight)
  - Defeated Michael Montgomery (Canada) 12–8
  - Lost to Bakhtovar Nazirov (Russia) 9–14 (bronze)
- 2012 Youth World Championships in Yerevan, Armenia (flyweight)
  - Lost to Tural Ahmadov (Azerbaijan) 12–21
- 2013 Youth National Championships in Trondheim, Norway (lightweight)
  - Defeated Isak Dyhre 20–9
  - Defeated Jonas Twang 29–6 (gold)
- 2013 European Youth Championships in Rotterdam, Netherlands (lightweight)
  - Lost to Michael McDonagh (Ireland) 1–2
- 2013 Nordic Championships in Aarhus, Denmark (lightweight – youth)
  - Defeated Muhammed Abdallah (Denmark) 22–16
  - Defeated Bager Mohammadi (Sweden) 21–19 (gold)
- 2013 Mostar International Youth Tournament in Mostar, Bosnia and Herzegovina (lightweight)
  - Lost to Adem Fetahovic (Bosnia and Herzegovina) 0–5 (bronze)
- 2013 Brandenburg Youth Cup in Frankfurt n/Oder, Germany (lightweight)
  - Lost to Shamil Askerov (Russia) 0–3
- 2013 Falken Cup in Gävle, Sweden (lightweight)
  - Lost to Salomo N'Tuve (Sweden) 0–3 (bronze)
- 2014 Youth National Championships in Drammen, Norway (lightweight)
  - Defeated Angelo Bernhard Torres 3–0
  - Defeated Rolf Olsen 3–0 (gold)
- 2014 National Championships in Tønsberg, Norway (lightweight)
  - Defeated Diddi Hugues 3–0 (gold)
- 2014 Gee-Bee Tournament in Helsinki, Finland (lightweight B)
  - Defeated Jesse Jouhki (Finland) 3–0
  - Defeated Juri Jaanissoo (Estonia) 3–0 (gold)
- 2014 Ahmet Comert Tournament in Istanbul, Turkey (lightweight)
  - Lost to Hakan Doğan (Turkey) 0–3
- 2014 Gripen Cup in Söderköping, Sweden (light-welterweight)
  - Defeated Jacob Zschiedrich (Sweden) TKO
  - Lost to Mohammed al-Maliki (Sweden) 0–3 (silver)
- 2014 Tammer Tournament in Tampere, Finland (lightweight)
  - Lost to Robenílson de Jesus (Brazil) 1–2
- 2015 Istvan Bocskai Memorial in Debrecen, Hungary (lightweight)
  - Lost to Mahmoud Abdelaal (Egypt) 1–2
- 2015 Strandja Memorial in Sofia, Bulgaria (light-welterweight)
  - Lost to Batuhan Gözgeç (Turkey) 0–3
- 2015 National Championships in Oslo, Norway (light-welterweight)
  - Defeated Qasim Imtiaz 3–0
  - Lost to Salavat Khatujev 1–2 (silver)
- 2015 Beogradski Pobednik in Belgrade, Serbia (light-welterweight)
  - Defeated Igor Lazarev (Russia) 3–0
  - Defeated Jason Easton (Scotland) 3–0 (gold)
- 2015 Algirdas Socikas Tournament in Kaunas, Lithuania (light-welterweight)
  - Defeated Dmitri Galagot (Moldova) 2–1
  - Lost to Hassan Amzile (France) 0–3 (silver)
- 2015 Haringey Box Cup in London, England (light-welterweight)
  - Defeated Alfie Price (England) 2–1
  - Defeated Kane Gardner (England) 3–0
  - Defeated Jacob Gabriel (England) 2–1 (gold)
- 2015 European Championships in Samokov, Bulgaria (light-welterweight)
  - Lost to Florentin Niculescu (Romania) 0–3
- 2015 President's Cup in Erzurum, Turkey (light-welterweight)
  - Defeated Muhammet Onur Kara (Turkey) 3–0
  - Lost to Elvin Isayev (Azerbaijan) 0–2
- 2015 HSK Box Cup in Hillerød, Denmark (light-welterweight)
  - Defeated Emil Pettersson (Sweden) 3–0 (gold)
- 2015 Angered City Boxing Cup in Gothenburg, Sweden (light-welterweight)
  - Defeated Rickard Loeberg (Sweden) 3–0
  - Lost to Laziz Sharifov (Sweden) 0–3 (silver)
- 2015 Tammer Tournament in Tampere, Finland (light-welterweight)
  - Defeated Sebastian Konsek (Poland) 3–0
  - Lost to Hovhannes Martirosyan (Belarus) TKO2 (bronze)
- 2016 Istvan Bocskai Memorial in Debrecen, Hungary (light-welterweight)
  - Lost to Fatih Keleş (Turkey) 0–3
- 2016 Strandja Memorial in Sofia, Bulgaria (light-welterweight)
  - Defeated Maeredud Thomas (Wales) 3–0
  - Lost to Wayne Kelly (Ireland) 0–3
- 2016 National Championships in Trondheim, Norway (light-welterweight)
  - Defeated Daniel Bakke 3–0
  - Defeated Kevin Johansen 3–0
  - Lost to Angelo Bernhard Torres 1–2 (silver)
- 2016 Gee-Bee Tournament in Helsinki, Finland (light-welterweight)
  - Defeated Zsolt Osadan (Slovakia) 3–0
  - Lost to Alfie Price (England) 0–3 (bronze)
- 2016 Nordic Championships in Gothenburg, Sweden (light-welterweight)
  - Lost to Laziz Sharifov (Sweden) 0–3 (bronze)
- 2016 European Olympic Qualification Tournament in Samsun, Turkey (light-welterweight)
  - Lost to Batuhan Gözgeç (Turkey) 0–3
- 2017 National Championships in Tønsberg, Norway (welterweight)
  - Defeated Barzan Palany-Jafi 5–0
  - Defeated Jamsid Nazari 5–0
  - Defeated Ruslan Sjidokaev 5–0 (gold)
- 2017 European U-22 Championships in Brăila, Romania (light-welterweight)
  - Defeated Samuel Molina (Spain) 5–0
  - Lost to Lasha Guruli (Georgia) 1–4
- 2017 Nordic Championships in Gilleleje, Denmark (light-welterweight)
  - Defeated Amin Nuri (Finland) 4–1
  - Defeated Yohannes Berhane (Sweden) 3–2 (gold)
- 2017 European Championships in Kharkiv, Ukraine (light-welterweight)
  - Defeated Robbie McKechnie (Scotland) 4–1
  - Lost to Evaldas Petrauskas (Lithuania) 1–4
- 2017 World Championships in Hamburg, Germany (light-welterweight)
  - Lost to Freudis Rojas (United States) 0–5
- 2017 King of the Ring Tournament in Borås, Sweden (welterweight)
  - Defeated Barzan Palany-Jafi (Norway) 5–0
  - Defeated Adolpe Sylva (Sweden) KO3
  - Defeated Alex Bishop (England) 2–1 (gold)
- 2018 Strandja Memorial in Sofia, Bulgaria (light-welterweight)
  - Defeated Patriot Behrami (Kosovo) 3–2
  - Lost to Alexandros Tsanikidis (Greece) 0–5
- 2018 National Championships in Oslo, Norway (light-welterweight)
  - Defeated Kevin Groenlund RSC3
  - Defeated Maikel Gomez 5–0
  - Defeated Adrian Haug 5–0 (gold)
- 2018 Nordic Championships in Oslo, Norway (light-welterweight)
  - Defeated Emil Stor (Sweden) 5–0
  - Defeated Joonas Koivuranta (Finland) 4–1 (gold)
- 2018 Ahmet Comert Tournament in Istanbul, Turkey (light-welterweight)
  - Defeated Harry Garside (Australia) 4–1
  - Lost to Cengiz Uyumaz (Turkey) 0–5
- 2018 Tammer Tournament in Tampere, Finland (light-welterweight)
  - Defeated Sugar Ray Ocana (Philippines) KO1
  - Lost to Wanderson Oliveira (Brazil) 1–4 (bronze)
- 2018 Golden Gloves in Niš, Serbia (light-welterweight)
  - Defeated Nikola Ristić (Serbia) AB2
  - Defeated Ivan Atanasov (Bulgaria) 5–0
  - Lost to Abdelhak Nadir (Morocco) 1–4 (silver)
- 2019 Strandja Memorial in Sofia, Bulgaria (light-welterweight)
  - Defeated Dalis Kaleiopu (United States) 5–0
  - Lost to Aleksei Mazur (Russia) 1–4
- 2019 National Championships in Norway (welterweight)
  - Defeated Amin Srour WO
  - Defeated Hadi Mohammadi 5–0
  - Defeated Yusof Mohammed Abid 5–0 (gold)
- 2019 Grand Prix Ústí nad Labem in Ústí nad Labem, Czechia (welterweight B)
  - Defeated Lim Hyun-chul (South Korea) 3–2
  - Defeated Tugruhan Erdemir (Turkey) WO
  - Lost to Lorenzo Sotomayor (Cuba) 1–4 (silver)
- 2019 European Games in Minsk, Belarus (welterweight)
  - Lost to Eskerkhan Madiev (Georgia) 1–4

== Professional career ==
Srour made his professional debut on 3 February 2018, defeating English journeyman Michael Mooney by third-round technical knockout (TKO) in Arendal. He finished Artur Zemlianyi in the same fashion a few months later in Oslo. In early 2019 he defeated Zoltan Szabo by unanimous decision (UD) to move to 3–0, joining Sauerland Promotions on a three-year deal soon thereafter. In his first fight under the Sauerland banner on 17 August 2019, he won a unanimous decision over Russian fighter Evgenii Vazem in Germany.

== Doping allegations ==
In September 2019 it was announced he had failed a drug test taken in July when traces of synthetic erythropoietin, also known as EPO, were found in his urine; he was subsequently dropped from the 2019 World Championships by the Norwegian Boxing Federation. He was accused of taking the "blood booster" following his loss in the European Games and before his professional fight in Germany. His only explanation was that he could have accidentally ingested something at Stavernfestivalen, the music festival he attended the day before the test.

Anti-Doping Norway recommended a four-year ban from the sport for Srour after he maintained his innocence and refused to confess. He appeared before the Norwegian Sports Confederation prosecution committee in September 2020, hiring a team of professors to present an expert report that disputed the positive test results. He was finally convicted in November and given the maximum sentence of a four-year ban.

== Professional boxing record ==
4 fights	4 wins	0 losses
By knockout	2	0
By decision	2	0

No.	Result	Record	Opponent	Type	Round, time	Date	Location	Notes
4	Win	4–0	(Russia) Evgenii Vazem	UD	6	17 Aug 2019	Friedrich-Ebert-Halle, Ludwigshafen, Germany	
3	Win	3–0	(Hungary) Zoltan Szabo	UD	6	2 Mar 2019	SØR Amfi, Arendal, Norway	
2	Win	2–0	(Ukraine) Artur Zemlianyi	TKO	3 (4), 2:18	26 May 2018	Skur 13, Oslo, Norway	
1	Win	1–0	(United Kingdom) Michael Mooney	TKO	3 (4), 1:18	3 Feb 2018	SØR Amfi, Arendal, Norway	

== Personal life ==
Born in Borgheim, Srour lived in Tønsberg before moving to Oslo for his schooling. He is of Lebanese descent.
