= Boxing at the 2016 Summer Olympics – Men's light welterweight =

Boxing competitions

Men's light welterweight boxing at the Games of the XXXI Olympiad
- Venue: Riocentro – Pavilion 6
- Date: 10–21 August 2016
- Competitors: 28 from 28 nations

Medalists
1st place, gold medalist(s)		Fazliddin Gaibnazarov	Uzbekistan
2nd place, silver medalist(s)		Lorenzo Sotomayor	Azerbaijan
3rd place, bronze medalist(s)		Vitaly Dunaytsev	Russia
3rd place, bronze medalist(s)		Artem Harutyunyan	Germany

The men's light welterweight boxing competition at the 2016 Olympic Games in Rio de Janeiro was held from 10 to 21 August at the Riocentro.

The medals for the competition were presented by Sir Austin L. Sealy, KT, Barbados, IOC member, and the gifts were presented by Kelani Bayor, Vice President of the AIBA.

== Schedule ==
All times are Brasília Time (UTC−3).

Date	Time	Round
Wednesday, 10 August 2016	12:27	Round of 32
Thursday, 11 August 2016	11:52	Round of 32
Sunday, 14 August 2016	13:02	Round of 16
Tuesday, 16 August 2016	12:09	Quarter-finals
Friday, 19 August 2016	14:30	Semi-finals
Sunday, 21 August 2016	15:00	Final

== Results ==
=== Finals ===
Semi-finals
Vitaly Dunaytsev (RUS)	1
Fazliddin Gaibnazarov (UZB)	2
Artem Harutyunyan (GER)	0
Lorenzo Sotomayor (AZE)	3

Final
Fazliddin Gaibnazarov (UZB)	2
Lorenzo Sotomayor (AZE)	1

=== Top half ===
Round of 32
Thulasi Tharumalingam (QAT)	0
Baatarsükh Chinzorig (MGL)	3
Luis Arcon (VEN)	1
Hovhannes Bachkov (ARM)	2
Hu Qianxun (CHN)	WO^{1}
Raúl Curiel Garcia (MEX)
Fazliddin Gaibnazarov (UZB)	TKO
Dival Malonga (CGO)
Manoj Kumar (IND)	2
Evaldas Petrauskas (LTU)	1
Richardson Hitchins (HAI)	0
Gary Antuanne Russell (USA)	3

Round of 16
Vitaly Dunaytsev (RUS)	3
Baatarsükh Chinzorig (MGL)	0
Hovhannes Bachkov (ARM)	1
Hu Qianxun (CHN)	2
Fazliddin Gaibnazarov (UZB)	3
Manoj Kumar (IND)	0
Gary Antuanne Russell (USA)	2
Wuttichai Masuk (THA)	1

Quarter-finals
Vitaly Dunaytsev (RUS)	3
Hu Qianxun (CHN)	0
Fazliddin Gaibnazarov (UZB)	2
Gary Antuanne Russell (USA)	1

Semi-finals
Vitaly Dunaytsev (RUS)	1
Fazliddin Gaibnazarov (UZB)	2

^{1} Hu won by walkover as Garcia was injured.

=== Bottom half ===
Round of 32
Obada Al-Kasbeh (JOR)	0
Arthur Biyarslanov (CAN)	3
Batuhan Gözgeç (TUR)	3
Mahaman Smaila (CMR)	0
Joedison Teixeira (BRA)	2
Abdelkader Chadi (ALG)	1
Lorenzo Sotomayor (AZE)	3
Volodymyr Matviychuk (UKR)	0
Jonas Junias (NAM)	0
Hassan Amzile (FRA)	3
Ablaikhan Zhussupov (KAZ)	1
Pat McCormack (GBR)	2

Round of 16
Artem Harutyunyan (GER)	2
Arthur Biyarslanov (CAN)	0
Batuhan Gözgeç (TUR)	3
Joedison Teixeira (BRA)	0
Lorenzo Sotomayor (AZE)	2
Hassan Amzile (FRA)	1
Pat McCormack (GBR)	1
Yasniel Toledo (CUB)	2

Quarter-finals
Artem Harutyunyan (GER)	3
Batuhan Gözgeç (TUR)	0
Lorenzo Sotomayor (AZE)	3
Yasniel Toledo (CUB)	0

Semi-finals
Artem Harutyunyan (GER)	0
Lorenzo Sotomayor (AZE)	3
