= Freudis Rojas =

American boxer (born 1998)

Personal information
- Born: 13 August 1998 (age 28) Las Vegas, Nevada, U.S.
- Height: 5 ft 11 1/2 in (182 cm)
- Weight: Welterweight, Super-welterweight

Boxing career
- Stance: Southpaw

Boxing record
- Total fights: 17
- Wins: 15
- Win by KO: 11
- Losses: 2
Medal record
Men's amateur boxing
Representing United States
World Championships
Bronze medal – third place	2017 Hamburg	Light welterweight
Pan American Championship
Bronze medal – third place	2017 Tegucigalpa	Light welterweight

Freudis Rojas (born August 13, 1998) is an American professional boxer. As an amateur he won a bronze medal at the 2017 World Championships.

== Amateur career ==
=== World Championships result ===
Hamburg 2017

- First round: Defeated Hadi Srour (Norway) 5–0
- Second round: Defeated Vitaly Dunaytsev (Russia) 4–1
- Quarter-finals: Defeated Eslam El-Gendy (Egypt) 5–0
- Semi-finals: Defeated by Ikboljon Kholdarov (Uzbekistan) 4–1

== Professional career ==
Rojas turned professional in January 2021 and amassed a perfect record of 10 wins from 10 fights by the time he signed a promotional contract with Sampson Boxing in June 2023.

In his 14th pro-fight, he defeated Walter Cordoba via unanimous decision to win the vacant WBO Latino super-welterweight title at Club Unión Eléctrica in Córdoba, Argentina, on April 20, 2024.

After 15 successive victories, Rojas suffered his first professional loss when Damian Sosa defeated him by unanimous decision at Fontainebleau Las Vegas in Las Vegas, Nevada, United States, on April 25, 2026.

Taking the fight on just over three weeks notice as an injury replacement, he challenged WBC Continental Americas super-welterweight champion Joshua Kevin Anton at Rawhide Event Center in Chandler, Arizona, United States, on October 16, 2026. Rojas lost via unanimous decision.

== Professional boxing record ==
17 fights	15 wins	2 losses
By knockout	11	0
By decision	4	2

No.	Result	Record	Opponent	Type	Round, time	Date	Location	Notes
17	Loss	15-2	(United States) Joshua Kevin Anton	UD	10	Oct 16, 2026	(United States) Rawhide Event Center, Chandler, Arizona, U.S.	For WBC Continental Americas super-welterweight title
16	Loss	15-1	(Mexico) Damian Sosa	UD	10	Apr 25, 2026	(United States) Fontainebleau Las Vegas, Las Vegas, Nevada, U.S.	
15	Win	15-0	(United States) Maurice Lee	UD	8	Mar 22, 2025	(United States) Michelob Ultra Arena, Las Vegas, Nevada, U.S.	
14	Win	14-0	(Argentina) Walter Cordoba	UD	10	Apr 20, 2024	(United States) Club Unión Eléctrica, Córdoba, Argentina	Won vacant WBO Latino super-welterweight title
13	Win	13-0	(Venezuela) Cristian Baez	UD	10	Jan 17, 2024	(United States) Whitesands Events Center, Plant City, Florida, U.S.	
12	Win	12-0	(United States) Saul Bustos	UD	8	Sep 15, 2023	(United States) Boeing Center at Tech Port, San Antonio, Texas, U.S.	
11	Win	11-0	(Mexico) Diego Santiago Sanchez	TKO	7 (10) 0:58	Jul 15, 2023	(United States) Chelsea Ballroom, Cosmopolitan of Las Vegas, Las Vegas, Nevada, U.S.	
10	Win	10-0	(United States) Gilbert Venegas	KO	1 (6)	Feb 25, 2023	(United States) Caribe Royale Orlando, Orlando, Florida, U.S.	
9	Win	9-0	(Costa Rica) Jorge Mendez	RTD	4 (8) 3:00	Jul 30, 2022	Costa Rica	
8	Win	8-0	(Costa Rica) Jorge Mendez	RTD	4 (8) 3:00	May 14, 2022	BN Arena, Hatillo, San José, Costa Rica	
7	Win	7-0	(Costa Rica) Nicasio Campos	RTD	3 (8) 1:32	Jan 15, 2022	Gimnasio Comite Deportes de Escazu, Escazu, Costa Rica	
6	Win	6-0	(Mexico) Ricardo Hernandez Iglesias	KO	2 (6) 1:32	Dec 18, 2021	Gimnasio UAT, Reynosa, Mexico	
5	Win	5–0	(United States) DeAngelo Cunningham	TKO	2 (4), 2:57	Jul 24, 2021	(United States) World Gym Arena, Texas City, Texas, U.S.	
4	Win	4–0	(Brazil) Jader Alves de Oliveira	TKO	2 (6), 2:46	May 14, 2021	(United States) The Blind Tiger, Biloxi, Mississippi, U.S.	
3	Win	3–0	(Nicaragua) Moises Castro	KO	2 (6), 2:30	May 1, 2021	Gimnasio Tabarcia de Mora, San José, Costa Rica	
2	Win	2–0	(Costa Rica) Stanley Mendez	TKO	3 (8), 2:19	Apr 17, 2021	Fiesta Casino, San José, Costa Rica	
1	Win	1–0	(Nicaragua) Luis Solorzano	KO	1 (4), 1:09	Jan 30, 2021	Oxigeno Human Playground, Heredia, Costa Rica	
