= Boxing at the 2014 Central American and Caribbean Games =

Boxing competitions

- Venue: World Trade Center Veracruz
- Location: Veracruz, Mexico
- Dates: 21–29 November

The Boxing competition at the 2014 Central American and Caribbean Games was held in Veracruz, Mexico.

The tournament was scheduled to be held from 21 to 29 November at the World Trade Center Veracruz.

== Medal summary ==
=== Men's events ===
Event	Gold	Silver	Bronze
Light Fly −49 kg	Leonel de los Santos (DOM)	Yuberjen Martínez (COL)	Joselito Velázquez (MEX); Anthony Chacon (PUR)
Fly −52 kg	Yosbany Veitia (CUB)	Ceiber Ávila (COL)	Eduard Bermúdez (VEN); Jeyvier Cintrón (PUR)
Bantam −56 kg	Robeisy Ramírez (CUB)	Héctor García (DOM)	Sergio Chirino (MEX); Juan Reyes (GUA)
Light −60 kg	Lázaro Álvarez (CUB)	Lindolfo Delgado (MEX)	Jose Diaz (VEN); Michael Alexander (TRI)
Light Welter −64 kg	Yasniel Toledo (CUB)	Danielito Zorrilla (PUR)	Raúl Curiel (MEX); Luis Arcon (VEN)
Welter −69 kg	Roniel Iglesias (CUB)	Carl Heild (BAH)	Marvin Cabrera (MEX); Nicklaus Flaz (PUR)
Middle −75 kg	Arlen López (CUB)	Misael Rodríguez (MEX)	Raúl Sánchez (DOM); Omar López (NCA)
Light Heavy −81 kg	Julio César La Cruz (CUB)	Juan Carlos Carrillo (COL)	Rogelio Romero (MEX); Osmar Bravo (NCA)
Heavy −91 kg	Erislandy Savón (CUB)	Alfonso Flores (VEN)	Deivi Julio (COL); Michael Narvaez (PUR)
Super Heavy +91 kg	Yohandi Toirac (CUB)	Edgar Ramírez (MEX)	Edgar Muñoz (VEN); Jose Daniel Gaitan (CRC)

=== Women's events ===
Event	Gold	Silver	Bronze
Fly −51 kg	Ingrit Valencia (COL)	Sulem Urbina (MEX)	Kharla Magliocco (VEN); Mercedes Alicea (PUR)
Light −60 kg	Kiria Tapia (PUR)	Mirkin Sena (DOM)	Krisandy Rios (VEN); Angela Miranda (HON)
Middle −75 kg	Yenebier Guillén (DOM)	Alma Ibarra (MEX)	Jessica Caicedo (COL); Francelis Carmona (VEN)

== Medal table ==
* Host nation (Mexico)

Rank	Nation	Gold	Silver	Bronze	Total
1	Cuba	9	0	0	9
2	Dominican Republic	2	2	1	5
3	Colombia	1	3	2	6
4	Puerto Rico	1	1	5	7
5	Mexico*	0	5	5	10
6	Venezuela	0	1	7	8
7	Bahamas	0	1	0	1
8	Nicaragua	0	0	2	2
9	Costa Rica	0	0	1	1
9	Guatemala	0	0	1	1
9	Honduras	0	0	1	1
9	Trinidad and Tobago	0	0	1	1
Totals (12 entries)		13	13	26	52
