= Viktor Petrov (boxer) =

Ukrainian boxer (born 1996)

Personal information
- Nationality: Ukrainian
- Born: 16 May 1996 (age 30) Mykulyntsi, Ternopil Oblast, Ukraine
- Height: 1.72 m (5 ft 8 in)
- Weight: Welterweight

Boxing career
Medal record
Men's amateur boxing
Representing Ukraine
European Games
Bronze medal – third place	2015 Baku	Welterweight

Viktor Petrov (Ukrainian: Віктор Петров; 16 May 1996) is a Ukrainian amateur boxer in the welterweight division. He won a bronze medal at the 2015 European Games.

Petrov started boxing in Mykulyntsi where his father (also Viktor) opened a boxing school. He studied at the Ivano-Frankivsk Physical Training College. He was also coached by A. Chumakov.

He is a multiple medalist of junior boxing championships, including gold medals of the 2011 European Junior Boxing Championships in Keszthely and 2012 European Junior Boxing Championships in Sofia, silver medal of the 2014 World Junior Boxing Championships in Sofia, bronze medal of the 2011 World Junior Boxing Championships in Astana. He competed at the 2014 Summer Youth Olympics in Nanjing where he lost in quarterfinals to the future champion Vincenzo Arecchia from Italy.

Petrov achieved his first international success at the 2015 European Games in Baku. He first won against Ayrin Ismetov from Bulgaria, Hovhannes Bachkov from Armenia and Clarence Goyeram from Sweden, but he lost in semifinals to Lorenzo Sotomayor from Azerbaijan and won a bronze medal. At the 2015 World Championships in Doha, he but lost in round of 32 to Danielito Zorrilla from Puerto Rico.

In 2016, Petrov tried to qualify for the 2016 Summer Olympics. He first participated in the European Qualification Tournament in Samsun. There he lost to Batuhan Gözgeç from Turkey in round of 16. Then he competed in the World Qualifying Tournament in Baku where he lost in round of 64 to Gary Antuanne Russell from the United States.

At the 2021 World Championships in Belgrade, he won against Evgenii Kool from Russia, but lost in round of 16 to Wanderson de Oliveira from Brazil.
