= Boxing at the 2015 Pan American Games – Men's light welterweight =

Men's Light welterweight at the 2015 Pan American Games
- Venue: Oshawa Sports Centre
- Dates: July 18–24
- Competitors: 10 from 10 nations

Medalists
| Gold medal | Arthur Biyarslanov | Canada |
| Silver medal | Yasniel Toledo | Cuba |
| Bronze medal | Joedison Teixeira | Brazil |
| Bronze medal | Luis Arcon | Venezuela |

The light welterweight competition of the boxing events at the 2015 Pan American Games in Toronto, Ontario, Canada, was held between the 18 and 24 of July at the Oshawa Sports Centre. The defending champion is Roniel Iglesias of Cuba. Light welterweights is limited to those boxers weighing less than or equal to 60 kilograms.

Like all Pan American boxing events, the competition is a straight single-elimination tournament. Both semifinal losers are awarded bronze medals, so no boxers compete again after their first loss. Bouts consist of a 3 round "10-point must" scoring system used in the pro game, where the winner of each round must be awarded 10 points and the loser a lesser amount, and the elimination of the padded headgear. Five judges scored each bout. The winner will be the boxer who scored the most at the end of the match.

== Qualification ==
A total of ten boxers qualified to compete.

== Results ==
=== Bracket ===
Preliminaries; July 18, 2015
Luis Feliciano (USA) | 2
Rashield Williams (BAH) | 1
Carlos Tobar Romero (GUA) | 1
Eduardo Sanchez Ramirez (CRC) | 2

Quarterfinals; July 21, 2015
Yasniel Toledo (CUB) | 3
Luis Feliciano (USA) | 0
Raul Curiel (MEX) | 0
Joedison Teixeira (BRA) | 3
Lucas Gimenez (ARG) | 0
Arthur Biyarslanov (CAN) | 3
Eduardo Sanchez Ramirez (CRC) | 0
Luis Arcon (VEN) | 3

Semifinals; July 22, 2015
Yasniel Toledo (CUB) | 3
Joedison Teixeira (BRA) | 0
Arthur Biyarslanov (CAN) | 3
Luis Arcon (VEN) | 0

Finals; July 24, 2015
Yasniel Toledo (CUB) | 1
Arthur Biyarslanov (CAN) | 2
