= Boxing at the 2014 Asian Games – Men's 64 kg =

Boxing competitions

Men's 64 kg at the 2014 Asian Games
- Venue: Seonhak Gymnasium
- Date: 25 September – 3 October 2014
- Competitors: 20 from 20 nations

Medalists
gold medal	Wuttichai Masuk	Thailand
silver medal	Lim Hyun-chul	South Korea
bronze medal	Aziz Bebitow	Turkmenistan
bronze medal	Masatsugu Kawachi	Japan

The men's light welterweight (64 kilograms) event at the 2014 Asian Games took place from 25 September to 3 October 2014 at Seonhak Gymnasium, Incheon, South Korea.

== Schedule ==
All times are Korea Standard Time (UTC+09:00)

Date	Time	Event
Thursday, 25 September 2014	19:00	Preliminaries 1
Sunday, 28 September 2014	19:00	Preliminaries 2
Tuesday, 30 September 2014	19:00	Quarterfinals
Thursday, 2 October 2014	19:00	Semifinals
Friday, 3 October 2014	14:00	Final

== Results ==
Legend

- TKO — Won by technical knockout

=== Final ===
Final
Wuttichai Masuk (THA)	2
Lim Hyun-chul (KOR)	1

=== Top half ===
Preliminaries 1

Preliminaries 2
Dostonbek Turdiev (UZB)	TKO
Mabkhot Hadadi (KSA)
Wuttichai Masuk (THA)	3
Bhupendra Thapa (NEP)	0
Karrar Kadhim (IRQ)	3
Mohamed Dilshan (SRI)	0
Aziz Bebitow (TKM)	3
Udone Khanxay (LAO)	0

Quarterfinals
Dostonbek Turdiev (UZB)	1
Wuttichai Masuk (THA)	2
Karrar Kadhim (IRQ)	0
Aziz Bebitow (TKM)	3

Semifinals
Wuttichai Masuk (THA)	3
Aziz Bebitow (TKM)	0

=== Bottom half ===
Preliminaries 1
Seif Qraish (JOR)	0
Aamir Khan (PAK)	3
Masatsugu Kawachi (JPN)	2
Manoj Kumar (IND)	0
Fahad Abdulrahman (KUW)	0
Khir Akyazlan Azmi (MAS)	3
Dennis Galvan (PHI)	0
Baatarsükhiin Chinzorig (MGL)	3

Preliminaries 2
Ermek Sakenov (KGZ)	2
Aidar Amirzakov (KAZ)	1
Li Quanlong (CHN)	0
Lim Hyun-chul (KOR)	3
Aamir Khan (PAK)	0
Masatsugu Kawachi (JPN)	3
Khir Akyazlan Azmi (MAS)	0
Baatarsükhiin Chinzorig (MGL)	3

Quarterfinals
Ermek Sakenov (KGZ)	0
Lim Hyun-chul (KOR)	3
Masatsugu Kawachi (JPN)	2
Baatarsükhiin Chinzorig (MGL)	1

Semifinals
Lim Hyun-chul (KOR)	3
Masatsugu Kawachi (JPN)	0
