= Lim Hyun-chul =

South Korean boxer (born 1995)

Personal information
- Nationality: South Korean
- Born: 임현철; 12 May 1995 (age 31) Daejeon, South Korea
- Height: 5 ft 8 in (1.73 m)
- Weight: Light-welterweight; Welterweight

Boxing career
- Stance: Orthodox
Medal record
Men's amateur boxing
Representing South Korea
Asian Championships
Bronze medal – third place	2015 Bangkok	Light-welterweight
Asian Games
Silver medal – second place	2014 Incheon	Light-welterweight

Lim Hyun-chul (Korean: 임현철; born 12 May 1995) is a South Korean amateur boxer. He won a bronze medal at the 2015 Asian Championships and a silver medal at the 2014 Asian Games, both at light-welterweight.

== Early life ==
Lim Hyun-chul was born on 12 May 1995 in Daejeon, one minute ahead of his twin brother Lim Hyun-suk. The pair always showed talent in sports, beginning with football in elementary school after being inspired by the 2002 FIFA World Cup. In middle school, Hyun-chul took up boxing at the suggestion of a physical education teacher and his brother followed him into the gym a week later. Although their father originally opposed the idea, he agreed under the two conditions that they never give up and they never fight each other, which is why they always fought in separate divisions. Hyun-suk would later win a lightweight silver medal at the 2014 World University Championships.

== Amateur career ==
As a teenager Lim won three junior/youth national championships and participated in the 2011 Junior World Championships. He received his first call-up to the Korean national team in March 2014 and made his debut at the prestigious Chemistry Cup in Germany that spring, losing to Vitaly Dunaytsev in the quarterfinals. A few months later he won a silver medal in the light welterweight event of the 2014 Asian Games, taking three straight victories before losing to Wuttichai Masuk in the gold medal bout. Two judges scored the fight 28–28 while the third favored Masuk 29–27, giving the Thai veteran a rare split draw victory. In July 2015, Lim won two medals: a silver at the Golden Belt Tournament in Romania and a bronze at his second Chemistry Cup. He then reached the semi-finals of the 2015 Asian Championships, where he lost again to Masuk and took home the bronze medal. At the 2015 World Championships in Doha, he lost in the first round against Hovhannes Bachkov. In 2018 he won a bronze at the Beogradski Pobednik in Serbia before taking a quarter-finals exit at the Asian Games at the hands of eventual gold medalist Bobo-Usmon Baturov. The following year he lost to Masuk for a third time in his career in the finals of the Thailand Open International Tournament. He also took part in his second World Championships, beating Thulasi Tharumalingam before falling to Filip Wąchała.
