= Boxing at the 2018 Asian Games – Men's 64 kg =

Boxing competitions

Men's 64 kg at the 2018 Asian Games
- Venue: Jakarta International Expo
- Date: 25 August – 1 September 2018
- Competitors: 23 from 23 nations

Medalists
gold medal	Ikboljon Kholdarov	Uzbekistan
silver medal	Baatarsükhiin Chinzorig	Mongolia
bronze medal	Daisuke Narimatsu	Japan
bronze medal	Wuttichai Masuk	Thailand

The men's Light welterweight (64 kilograms) event at the 2018 Asian Games took place from 25 August to 1 September 2018 at Jakarta International Expo Hall, Jakarta, Indonesia.

== Schedule ==
All times are Western Indonesia Time (UTC+07:00)

Date	Time	Event
Saturday, 25 August 2018	13:00	Round of 32
Monday, 27 August 2018	13:00	Round of 16
Wednesday, 29 August 2018	13:00	Quarterfinals
Friday, 31 August 2018	18:00	Semifinals
Saturday, 1 September 2018	14:00	Final

== Results ==
Legend

- RSC — Won by referee stop contest

=== Final ===
Final
Ikboljon Kholdarov (UZB)	5
Baatarsükhiin Chinzorig (MGL)	0

=== Top half ===
Round of 32
Bhupendra Thapa (NEP)	0
Obada Al-Kasbeh (JOR)	4
Karrar Kadhim (IRQ)	5
Muhammet Berdibaýew (TKM)	0
Libertus Gha (INA)	5
Dorji Wangdi (BHU)	0

Round of 16
Ikboljon Kholdarov (UZB)	5
Obada Al-Kasbeh (JOR)	0
Lim Hyun-suk (KOR)	5
Suleman Baloch (PAK)	0
Nguyễn Văn Chung (VIE)	0
Karrar Kadhim (IRQ)	5
Libertus Gha (INA)	0
Daisuke Narimatsu (JPN)	5

Quarterfinals
Ikboljon Kholdarov (UZB)	4
Lim Hyun-suk (KOR)	0
Karrar Kadhim (IRQ)
Daisuke Narimatsu (JPN)	RSC

Semifinals
Ikboljon Kholdarov (UZB)	5
Daisuke Narimatsu (JPN)	0

=== Bottom half ===
Round of 32
Apolinário Alves (TLS)	0
Wang Gang (CHN)	5
Bakhodur Usmonov (TJK)	RSC
Dinidu Saparamadu (SRI)
Nurlan Kobashev (KGZ)	5
Hakan Erşeker (QAT)	0
Ri Kon-thae (PRK)	5
Zafar Azizi (AFG)	0

Round of 16
Bekdaulet Ibragimov (KAZ)	5
Wang Gang (CHN)	0
Bakhodur Usmonov (TJK)	1
Wuttichai Masuk (THA)	4
Dheeraj Rangi (IND)	3
Nurlan Kobashev (KGZ)	0
Ri Kon-thae (PRK)	0
Baatarsükhiin Chinzorig (MGL)	5

Quarterfinals
Bekdaulet Ibragimov (KAZ)	1
Wuttichai Masuk (THA)	4
Dheeraj Rangi (IND)	0
Baatarsükhiin Chinzorig (MGL)	5

Semifinals
Wuttichai Masuk (THA)	2
Baatarsükhiin Chinzorig (MGL)	3
