= Jeremias Ponce =

Argentinian boxer (born 1996)

Personal information
- Nickname: Jere
- Born: Jeremias Nicolas Ponce; 3 July 1996 (age 30) Buenos Aires, Argentina
- Height: 5 ft 10 1/2 in (179 cm)
- Weight: Super-lightweight; Welterweight

Boxing career
- Reach: 75 1/2 in (192 cm)
- Stance: Orthodox

Boxing record
- Total fights: 35
- Wins: 34
- Win by KO: 22
- Losses: 1

Jeremias Nicolas Ponce (born 3 July 1996) is an Argentine professional boxer. He is a former IBO super-lightweight champion.

== Professional career ==
Ponce made his professional debut against Jesus David Barraza on 4 September 2015. He won the fight by a third-round knockout. Ponce amassed a 13–0 record during the next two years, before being booked to fight Martin Ariel Ruiz for his first professional title, the vacant WBA Fedebol welterweight belt, on 15 December 2017. Ponce captured the vacant title with a first-round knockout of Ruiz. Two months later, on 14 February 2018, Ponce faced Francesco Lomasto for the vacant IBF Inter-Continental super lightweight title. He won the fight by a ninth-round technical knockout. Ponce made his first WBA Fedebol title defense against Martin Severo on 14 April 2018. He won the fight by a second-round technical knockout.

Ponce challenged the reigning Argentinian super lightweight champion Damian Leonardo Yapur on 16 June 2018. He won the fight by a ninth-round knockout, successfully capturing his third professional title. Ponce made his second WBA welterweight title defense against Humberto Santos Mamani on 21 September 2018. He won the fight by a third-round technical knockout. Ponce made his first Argentinian super lightweight title defense against Miguel Cesario Antin on 21 December 2018. He made quick work of his opponent, winning the fight by a first-round technical knockout.

Ponce was booked to face the reigning South American super lightweight titleholder Leonardo Fabio Amitrano on 27 April 2019. He won the fight by split decision. On 14 September 2019, Ponce faced Rico Mueller for the vacant IBO super lightweight title. He won the fight by majority decision.

He defeated Lewis Ritson to become the mandatory IBF world title challenger. However, as champion Josh Taylor was scheduled to defend against Jack Catterall, Ponce opted to face Michel Marcano in a stay-busy fight on 20 November 2021. He won by a second-round knockout.

With Taylor having relinquished the title, Ponce faced Subriel Matías for the now vacant IBF super-lightweight championship at Minneapolis Armory in Minneapolis, Minnesota, USA, on 25 February 2023. He lost when his corner retired him at the end of the fifth round.

== Professional boxing record ==
| 35 fights | 34 wins | 1 loss |
|---|---|---|
| By knockout | 22 | 1 |
| By decision | 12 | 0 |

| No. | Result | Record | Opponent | Type | Round, time | Date | Location | Notes |
|---|---|---|---|---|---|---|---|---|
| 35 | Win | 34–1 | Alexis Nahuel Torres | UD | 8 | 23 Aug 2025 | Escuela de Boxeo Santos Zacarías, Rafael Calzada, Argentina | |
| 34 | Win | 33–1 | Guido Marquez | TKO | 3 (8), ?:?? | 13 Dec 2024 | Estadio F.A.B., Buenos Aires, Argentina | |
| 33 | Win | 32–1 | Alexis Nahuel Torres | UD | 10 | 23 Aug 2024 | Club Social y Deportivo El Porvenir, Quilmes, Argentina | |
| 32 | Win | 31–1 | Andres Ramon Tejada | KO | 2 (10), ?:?? | 11 Nov 2023 | Club Social y Deportivo El Porvenir, Quilmes, Argentina | |
| 31 | Loss | 30–1 | Subriel Matías | RTD | 5 (12), 3:00 | 25 Feb 2023 | Minneapolis Armory, Minneapolis, Minnesota, U.S. | For vacant IBF super-lightweight title |
| 30 | Win | 30–0 | Achiko Odikadze | TKO | 3 (8), 0:40 | 23 Apr 2022 | Universum Gym, Hamburg, Germany | |
| 29 | Win | 29–0 | Michel Marcano | KO | 2 (8), 0:40 | 20 Nov 2021 | Universum Gym, Hamburg, Germany | |
| 28 | Win | 28–0 | Lewis Ritson | TKO | 10 (12), 1:24 | 12 Jun 2021 | Vertu Motors Arena, Newcastle, United Kingdom | |
| 27 | Win | 27–0 | Jonathan Jose Eniz | UD | 10 | 11 Dec 2020 | Estadio Mary Teran de Weiss, Buenos Aires, Argentina | |
| 26 | Win | 26–0 | Ruben Dario Lopez | KO | 1 (10) | 13 Nov 2020 | Autocine Jump Nordelta, Benavídez, Argentina | |
| 25 | Win | 25–0 | Rico Mueller | MD | 12 | 14 Sep 2019 | Verti Music Hall, Friedrichshain, Germany | Won vacant IBO super-lightweight title |
| 24 | Win | 24–0 | Leonardo Fabio Amitrano | SD | 12 | 27 Apr 2019 | Club Atletico Lanus, Lanus, Argentina | Won South American super-lightweight title |
| 23 | Win | 23–0 | Ramon De La Cruz Sena | KO | 5 (8) | 16 Feb 2019 | Escuela de Boxeo Santos Zacarías, Rafael Calzada, Argentina | |
| 22 | Win | 22–0 | Miguel Cesario Antin | TKO | 1 (10) | 21 Dec 2018 | Estadio Aldo Cantoni, San Juan, Argentina | Retained Argentina (FAB) super-lightweight title |
| 21 | Win | 21–0 | Guillermo de Jesus Paz | UD | 8 | 17 Nov 2018 | Escuela de Boxeo Santos Zacarías, Rafael Calzada, Argentina | |
| 20 | Win | 20–0 | Humberto Santos Mamani | TKO | 3 (9) | 21 Sep 2018 | Club Atlético y Social Villa Calzada, Rafael Calzada, Argentina | Retained WBA Fedebol welterweight title |
| 19 | Win | 19–0 | Sergio Mauricio Gil | TKO | 4 (8) | 4 Aug 2018 | Estadio Aldo Cantoni, San Juan, Argentina | |
| 18 | Win | 18–0 | Damian Leonardo Yapur | KO | 9 (10) | 16 Jun 2018 | Escuela de Boxeo Santos Zacarías, Rafael Calzada, Argentina | Won Argentina (FAB) super-lightweight title |
| 17 | Win | 17–0 | Carlos Andres Chaparro | UD | 8 | 19 May 2018 | Escuela de Boxeo Santos Zacarías, Rafael Calzada, Argentina | |
| 16 | Win | 16–0 | Martin Severo | TKO | 2 (9) | 14 Apr 2018 | Club Julio Mocoroa, San Juan, Argentina | Retained WBA Fedebol welterweight title |
| 15 | Win | 15–0 | Francesco Lomasto | TKO | 9 (12) | 24 Feb 2018 | PalaBarbuto, Napoli, Italy | Won vacant IBF Inter-Continental super-lightweight title |
| 14 | Win | 14–0 | Martin Ariel Ruiz | TKO | 1 (9) | 15 Dec 2017 | Estadio Aldo Cantoni, San Juan, Argentina | Won vacant WBA Fedebol welterweight title |
| 13 | Win | 13–0 | Brian Damian Chaves | KO | 1 (10) | 20 Oct 2017 | Club Social y Deportivo El Porvenir, Quilmes, Argentina | |
| 12 | Win | 12–0 | Martin Nicolas Matamala | UD | 6 | 4 Aug 2017 | Salon Tattersall, San Isidro, Argentina | |
| 11 | Win | 11–0 | Esteban David Rocabado | TKO | 3 (6) | 14 Jul 2017 | Centro Tradicionalista El Volcador, San Vicente, Argentina | |
| 10 | Win | 10–0 | Pablo Ezequiel Rodriguez | KO | 2 (6) | 13 May 2017 | Escuela de Boxeo Santos Zacarías, Rafael Calzada, Argentina | |
| 9 | Win | 9–0 | Jonathan Ariel Sosa | UD | 6 | 11 Mar 2017 | Escuela de Boxeo Santos Zacarías, Rafael Calzada, Argentina | |
| 8 | Win | 8–0 | Pablo Joel Fernandez | TKO | 5 (6) | 17 Dec 2016 | Escuela de Boxeo Santos Zacarías, Rafael Calzada, Argentina | |
| 7 | Win | 7–0 | Pablo Joel Fernandez | UD | 6 | 15 Oct 2016 | Escuela de Boxeo Santos Zacarías, Rafael Calzada, Argentina | |
| 6 | Win | 6–0 | Claudio Cesar Filipini | KO | 3 (6) | 20 Aug 2016 | Escuela de Boxeo Santos Zacarías, Rafael Calzada, Argentina | |
| 5 | Win | 5–0 | Leandro Ariel Ortega | UD | 6 | 14 May 2016 | Escuela de Boxeo Santos Zacarías, Rafael Calzada, Argentina | |
| 4 | Win | 4–0 | Luis Javier Aumada | SD | 4 | 12 Dec 2015 | Escuela de Boxeo Santos Zacarías, Rafael Calzada, Argentina | |
| 3 | Win | 3–0 | Lucas Gimenez | KO | 3 (4) | 30 Oct 2015 | Estadio F.A.B., Buenos Aires, Argentina | |
| 2 | Win | 2–0 | Adelio Samudio | TKO | 2 (4) | 16 Oct 2015 | Club Gimnasia y Esgrima, Ituzaingo, Argentina | |
| 1 | Win | 1–0 | Jesus David Barraza | KO | 3 (4) | 4 Sep 2015 | Estadio F.A.B., Buenos Aires, Argentina | |
