= Julian Smith (boxer) =

American deaf boxer, born 1990

Julian Smith (born December 31, 1990) is an American boxer. He is nicknamed "The Quiet Storm", and has been deaf since he was six months old.

== Early life ==
Smith contracted meningitis when he was six months old, which cost him his hearing. His older brother, Brandon, taught him to box when Julian was a freshman in high school. When Julian was 22, Brandon was shot and killed, and Julian began to box in his brother's memory.

== Career ==
Smith won his first Golden Gloves championship, in the 152-pound (69 kg) open division, in 2018, at age 27.

In February 2024, Smith defeated then-unbeaten Cuban boxer Orestes Velazquez at Jake Paul's Most Valuable Prospects show. Smith was a 14–1 underdog in the fight. The win, by technical knockout, earned Smith the international super lightweight belt of the World Boxing Association.

In July 2024, Smith defeated Shohjahon Ergashev by split decision at Little Caesars Arena, on the undercard of the Claressa Shields–Vanessa Lepage-Joanisse bout.

== See also ==
- Eugene Hairston, a deaf boxer active from 1945 to 1953
