= Subriel Matías =

Puerto Rican boxer (born 1992)

Personal information
- Nicknames: Browny; NoMás'Tías; El Orgullo de Maternillo ("The Pride of Maternillo")
- Born: Subriel Ahmed Matías Matthew; March 31, 1992 (age 34) Fajardo, Puerto Rico
- Height: 5 ft 9 in (175 cm)
- Weight: Super-lightweight

Boxing career
- Reach: 71 in (180 cm)
- Stance: Orthodox

Boxing record
- Total fights: 26
- Wins: 23
- Win by KO: 22
- Losses: 3

Subriel Ahmed Matías Matthew (born March 31, 1992) is a Puerto Rican professional boxer. He is a two-time super-lightweight champion, having held the WBC title from 2025 to 2026, and previously the IBF title from 2023 to 2024.

== Professional career ==
=== Early career ===
Matías made his professional debut against Juan Rojas on December 19, 2015. He won the fight by a first-round technical knockout. Matías amassed an 8–0 record before taking the first step up of his career on August 18, 2018, as he faced Colombian veteran Breidis Prescott. He won the fight by a third-round technical knockout. Prescott was twice knocked down in the third round, with a left hook and an uppercut, before retiring from the bout.

Matías faced the journeyman Wilberth López in a stay-busy fight on March 2, 2019. He won the fight by a sixth-round technical knockout. Matías would then face the undefeated Maxim Dadashev in an IBF junior welterweight title eliminator on July 19, 2019. Dadashev retired from the fight at the end of the eleventh round. He suffered a severe brain injury during the bout and passed away a few days later.

Matías faced Petros Ananyan on February 22, 2020, on the undercard of Deontay Wilder vs. Tyson Fury II. Despite entering the fight as a sizable favorite, he lost the fight by a close unanimous decision. Matías was staggered back to the ropes late in the seventh round, which referee Roberty Byrd ruled a knockdown. This proved to be the pivotal moment of the contest, as two of the judges scored the bout 95–94 for Ananyan, while the third judge gave his opponent a slightly wider scorecard of 96–93.

=== Rise up the ranks ===
Matías faced the undefeated Malik Hawkins on October 24, 2020. He won the fight by a seventh-round technical knockout. The contest was stopped a second into the round, on the advice of the ringside physician, who was previously called to check the injuries on Hawkins' face in the fifth round. All three judges had Matías up 59–54 at the time of the stoppage.

Matías faced Batyrzhan Jukembayev in an IBF junior welterweight title eliminator on May 29, 2021. Jukembayev retired from the fight at the end of the eighth round. Matías had knocked him down with a left hook in the fourth round and was up 77–74, 77–74 and 76–75 on the scorecards by the end of the final round.

Matías faced Petros Ananyan on January 22, 2022. The pair previously fought on February 22, 2020, when Ananyan was able to win by a narrow unanimous decision. He was unable to replicate his earlier success however, as he was forced to retire at the end of the tenth round, after he was knocked down with a left hook in the previous round. Matías was up 89–81 on two of the judges' scorecards at the time of the stoppage and 88–82 on the last one.

=== IBF super-lightweight champion ===
==== Matías vs. Ponce ====
On June 3, 2022, the IBF ordered Matías to face Jeremias Ponce for the interim IBF super-lightweight title. On July 7, the sanctioning body instead ordered the unified super-lightweight champion Josh Taylor to make a mandatory title defense against Ponce. Taylor refused the fight on August 24 and officially vacated the belt on that same day. The IBF immediately ordered a vacant championship bout between Matías and Ponce. Although the fight was scheduled to take place on October 15, on the undercard of the Deontay Wilder and Robert Helenius Fox Sports pay-per-view, it was postponed as Ponce was unable to secure a visa in time for the fight. The title bout was rescheduled for February 11, 2023, before being postponed to February 25. It took place at the Armory in Minneapolis, Minnesota and headlined a Showtime broadcast card. Matías won the fight by a fifth-round stoppage, as Ponce's corner decided to retire their fighter at the end of the round.

==== Matías vs. Ergashev ====
On June 16, 2023, it was reported that Matías would make a voluntary title defense against Sergey Lipinets. Twelve days later however, the IBF ordered Matías to make a mandatory defense against the undefeated Shohjahon Ergashev. As the two camps failed to reach an agreement within the allotted negotiation period, a purse bid was scheduled for August 15, although it was later postponed by a week as both sides requested an extension. The promotional rights were eventually won by Premier Boxing Champions, on behalf of Matias, with a bid of $510,000. The fight took place on November 25. Ergashev retired from the bout at the beginning of the sixth round, citing inability to compete due to a leg injury as the reason for his withdrawal from the fight.

==== Matías vs. Paro ====
On February 4, 2024 it was reported that Matias would make the second defense of his IBF super lightweight title against Liam Paro in the summer 2024 in Puerto Rico. In February, it was reported that the fight was off, and Elvis Rodriguez was a possible contender. On March 12, it was reported that the fight was back on for June 15, 2024 in Manati, Puerto Rico. On March 27, 2024 the fight against Paro was confirmed for June 15, 2024 in Manati, Puerto Rico. Matias lost the fight by unanimous decision.

=== WBC super-lightweight champion ===
==== Matías vs. Puello ====
Matías faced Alberto Puello for the WBC super-lightweight title at Louis Armstrong Stadium in New York on July 12, 2025. He won by majority decision with two of the ringside judges scoring the fight 115–113 in his favour, while the third had it a 114–114 draw.

==== Failed anti-doping test ====
On November 20, 2025, it was reported that Matías had failed an anti-doping test with the banned substance Ostarine being found in a urine sample he provided to the Voluntary Anti-Doping Association (VADA). On December 3, 2025, the WBC ruled the positive test was caused by contaminated supplements and placed Matías on probation for one year including further testing to be paid for by the boxer.

==== Matías vs. Smith ====
Matías made the first defense of his title against Dalton Smith at Barclays Center in Brooklyn, New York, on January 10, 2026. He was knocked to the canvas in the fifth round and, although he got back to his feet, the referee ruled he was not fit to continue and waved the fight off, giving Smith the win by technical knockout.

== Personal life ==
Matías was raised in Maternillo, a poor seaside fishing community of Fajardo. He received support from his mother, his grandmother Viviana, and people close to the family, such as father figure Julio de Jesús. Matías developed an early interest in motorcycling and he was gifted two, a Harley Davidson and a Vespa. He was involved in criminal activities as a youth, suffering a gunshot wound on August 10, 2012, and serving a 19-month term in prison. Afterwards, Matías took up boxing as a career and signed as a professional in 2015. He credits these experiences with giving him a strong mind, showing him how to deal with adversity and providing the time to find himself and faith. Matías is married to Yachari Benabe, and has three daughters.

== Professional boxing record ==
26 fights	23 wins	3 losses
By knockout	22	1
By decision	1	2

No.	Result	Record	Opponent	Type	Round, time	Date	Location	Notes
26	Loss	23–3	Dalton Smith	TKO	5 (12), 2:24	Jan 10, 2026	Barclays Center, Brooklyn, New York City, New York, U.S.	Lost WBC light-welterweight title
25	Win	23–2	Alberto Puello	MD	12	Jul 12, 2025	Louis Armstrong Stadium, New York City, Queens, New York, U.S.	Won WBC light-welterweight title
24	Win	22–2	Gabriel Gollaz Valenzuela	TKO	8 (12), 2:55	Mar 1, 2025	Coliseo Tomas Dones, Fajardo, Puerto Rico	
23	Win	21–2	Roberto Ramírez	TKO	2 (10), 2:16	Nov 9, 2024	Coliseo Rubén Rodríguez, Bayamón, Puerto Rico	
22	Loss	20–2	Liam Paro	UD	12	Jun 15, 2024	Coliseo Juan Aubin Cruz Abreu, Manatí, Puerto Rico	Lost IBF light-welterweight title
21	Win	20–1	Shohjahon Ergashev	RTD	6 (12), 3:00	Nov 25, 2023	Michelob Ultra Arena, Paradise, Nevada, U.S.	Retained IBF light-welterweight title
20	Win	19–1	Jeremias Ponce	RTD	5 (12), 3:00	Feb 25, 2023	Minneapolis Armory, Minneapolis, Minnesota, U.S.	Won vacant IBF light-welterweight title
19	Win	18–1	Petros Ananyan	RTD	9 (12), 3:00	Jan 22, 2022	Borgata Hotel Casino, Atlantic City, New Jersey, U.S.	
18	Win	17–1	Batyrzhan Jukembayev	RTD	8 (12), 3:00	May 29, 2021	Dignity Health Sports Park, Carson, California, U.S.	
17	Win	16–1	Malik Hawkins	RTD	7 (10), 0:01	Oct 24, 2020	Mohegan Sun Arena, Uncasville, Connecticut, U.S.	
16	Loss	15–1	Petros Ananyan	UD	10	Feb 22, 2020	MGM Grand Garden Arena, Paradise, Nevada, U.S.	
15	Win	15–0	Jonathan Eniz	TKO	5 (10), 2:59	Nov 30, 2019	Tomás Coliseo Dones, Fajardo, Puerto Rico	
14	Win	14–0	Maxim Dadashev	RTD	11 (12), 3:00	Jul 19, 2019	MGM National Harbor, Oxon Hill, Maryland, U.S.	Dadashev later died of injuries
13	Win	13–0	Wilberth López	TKO	6 (10), 1:52	Mar 2, 2019	Tomás Coliseo Dones, Fajardo, Puerto Rico	
12	Win	12–0	Fernando Saucedo	TKO	1 (10), 3:00	Oct 27, 2018	Lakefront Arena, New Orleans, Louisiana, U.S.	
11	Win	11–0	Breidis Prescott	KO	4 (10), 0:36	Aug 18, 2018	Parque Pedro Cepeda, Cataño, Puerto Rico	
10	Win	10–0	Adrián Estrella	RTD	4 (10), 3:00	May 19, 2018	Parque Pedro Cepeda, Cataño, Puerto Rico	
9	Win	9–0	Daulis Prescott	TKO	3 (10), 0:23	Feb 17, 2018	Coliseo Ecuestre Municipal, Fajardo, Puerto Rico	
8	Win	8–0	Patrick López	TKO	2 (8), 1:42	Nov 18, 2017	Hotel Jaragua, Santo Domingo, Dominican Republic	
7	Win	7–0	Luis Pelayo	TKO	2 (8), 0:26	Aug 5, 2017	Coliseo Ecuestre Municipal, Fajardo, Puerto Rico	
6	Win	6–0	Abrahan Peralta	RTD	2 (10), 3:00	Jun 25, 2017	Hotel Jaragua, Santo Domingo, Dominican Republic	
5	Win	5–0	Joaquim Carneiro	TKO	3 (8), 2:13	Mar 25, 2017	Parque Concepción Pérez Alberto, Fajardo, Puerto Rico	
4	Win	4–0	Jeffrey Fontanez	TKO	2 (6), 2:48	Dec 10, 2016	Cosme Beitía Sálamo Coliseum, Cataño, Puerto Rico	
3	Win	3–0	Luis Rodríguez	TKO	4 (6), 1:49	Sep 9, 2016	Cosme Beitía Sálamo Coliseum, Cataño, Puerto Rico	
2	Win	2–0	Ramón Meléndez	TKO	2 (4), 2:59	Jul 16, 2016	Tomás Dones Coliseum, Fajardo, Puerto Rico	
1	Win	1–0	Juan Rojas	TKO	1 (4), 1:01	Dec 19, 2015	Tomás Dones Coliseum, Fajardo, Puerto Rico	

== See also ==
- List of male boxers
- Afro–Puerto Ricans
- Boxing in Puerto Rico
- List of Puerto Rican boxing world champions
- List of world light-welterweight boxing champions

Sporting positions
World boxing titles
Vacant Title last held by Josh Taylor	IBF light-welterweight champion February 25, 2023 – June 15, 2024	Succeeded by Liam Paro
Preceded by Alberto Puello	WBC light-welterweight champion July 12, 2025 – January 10, 2026	Next: Dalton Smith
