= Ali Srour =

Norwegian professional boxer (born 1994)

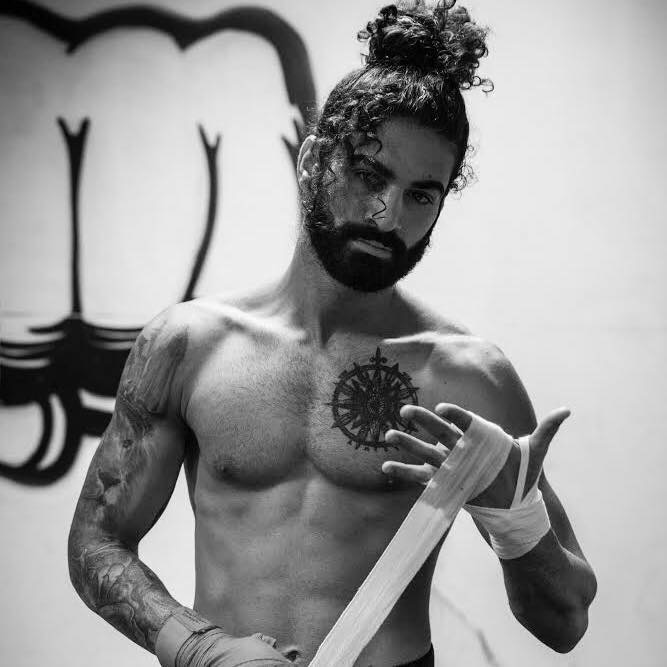
Ali Srour in 2018

Ali Srour (Arabic: علي سرور) (born 11 June 1994), also known as Alex Hani, is a Norwegian professional boxer of Lebanese descent. As an amateur, he has been Norwegian champion and Nordic champion several times. He is the brother of fellow boxer Hadi Srour, who was convicted of doping in 2020 and received the maximum sentence of a four-year ban.

Under the name Alex Hani, Srour was sentenced to ten years and six months in prison for multiple rapes in September 2025.

== Early life ==
Srour was born in 1994 in Tønsberg, Norway to Lebanese parents. He started boxing when he was 12 years old at the TK boxing club in his hometown of Tønsberg. At the age of 12, he started his amateur career, and has become national junior champion eight times, and Scandinavian junior champion twice.

== Professional career ==
Srour lost in his last Nordic Championship in 2013, resulting in a silver medal. Srour has also competed in the European Youth Championship, ending with a loss to Gabil Mamedov from Russia who took silver medal.

Srour was supposed to box in the undercard to Cecilia Brækhus in Oslofjord Convention Center, but the opponent resigned. Afterwards, Srour traveled to South America and started his professional career there.

== Legal issues ==
In June 2025, Srour was indicted on multiple counts of rape. According to VG, the indictment covers four incidents between 2018 and 2024, including one classified as aggravated rape. The online newspaper Uten Filter identified the man mentioned in the VG article as Ali Srour, now known as Alex Hani. In September 2025, he was sentenced to ten years and six months in prison for the rapes.

== Professional boxing record ==
4 fights	4 wins	0 losses
By knockout	3	0
By decision	1	0

No.	Result	Record	Opponent	Type	Round, time	Date	Location	Notes
4	Win	4–0	(Georgia (country)) Girogi Gachechiladze	UD	4	20 Oct 2018	Skien Fritidspark, Skien, Norway	
3	Win	3–0	(Mexico) Luis Ángel Díaz Ramírez	TKO	4 (4)	10 Mar 2018	Domo del Parque San Rafael, Guadalajara, Mexico	
2	Win	2–0	(Mexico) Efrén Martínez López	TKO	1 (4)	10 Feb 2018	San José Iturbide, Mexico	
1	Win	1–0	(Mexico) Rafael Herrera Amezcua	KO	2 (4)	2 Dec 2017	Puerto Vallarta, Mexico	
