= Dean Walsh =

Irish former amateur boxer (born 1994)

Personal information
- Nationality: Irish
- Born: 25 June 1994 (age 32) Wexford Town, County Wexford, Ireland
- Height: 1.78 m (5 ft 10 in)
- Weight: Light-welterweight; Welterweight

Boxing career
Medal record
Men's amateur boxing
Representing Ireland
European Championships
Bronze medal – third place	2015 Samokov	Light-welterweight

Dean Walsh (born 25 June 1994) is current 2023 71 kg national elite Irish champion. His achievements include five Irish Elite titles and a bronze medal at the 2015 European Championships in Bulgaria.

== Amateur career ==
Walsh boxed for St. Ibar's Boxing Club, Wexford where he was trained by his uncle Billy Walsh. Walsh started boxing in 2001 before participating in the 2010 European Junior Championships in Ukraine, where he finished sixth. In 2011, he finished runner-up at the Irish Youth Championships, won the Irish Intermediate Championships in 2012, and won the Irish U-22 Championships 2013.

At the Feliks Stamm Tournament in 2014 he won a bronze medal after beating Bogdan Vikazin in the semi-finals before being eliminated by Vitaly Dunaytsev.

He debuted in the Irish Elite Championships in the light welterweight division. His first Irish Elite title came in 2014 at light welterweight. Walsh would go on to win a total of four Irish Elite titles across two weights including winning the award for Best Irish Boxer twice.

In 2015, he competed at the European Championships in Samokov, Bulgaria, beating Florentin Niculescu from Romania in the 'Round of 32' and Hungary's Georgian Mihai Nyeki in the quarter-final but lost in the semi-finals on points against Vitaly Dunaytsev of Russia.

== Professional career ==
Walsh spoke of his desire to turn professional in 2018, but decided to remain in the amateur ranks and target qualification for the 2020 Olympics in Tokyo. However, after postponement of the Tokyo Olympiad, Walsh decided to turn professional in August 2020.

== Prison ==
In November 2019, Walsh pleaded guilty to two charges of assault stemming from an incident in 2017, in which one victim was left with a broken jaw, fractured cheekbone and requiring a metal plate to be inserted into his skull. Walsh was placed on bail with a sentencing hearing scheduled for February 2020. In December 2020, he was sentenced to four years imprisonment, with the final 18 months suspended.
