= World Trade Center Veracruz =

The World Trade Center Veracruz is a building complex affiliated to the World Trade Centers Association. It's located in Boca del Río, Veracruz., and it has direct access to Plaza Las Américas mall, Galería Plaza hotel and a Cinépolis IMAX Theater. It has an area of 16,000 square meters.
