= Arthur Biyarslanov =

Canadian boxer (born 1995)

Personal information
- Nickname: The Chechen Wolf
- Nationality: Canadian
- Born: Movladdin Biyarslanov; 22 April 1995 (age 31) Makhachkala, Dagestan, Russia
- Height: 1.75 m (5 ft 9 in)
- Weight: Super lightweight

Boxing career
- Stance: Southpaw

Boxing record
- Total fights: 21
- Wins: 21
- Win by KO: 17
- Losses: 0
Medal record
Men's amateur boxing
Representing Canada
Pan American Games
Gold medal – first place	2015 Toronto	Super lightweight

Arthur Biyarslanov (born 22 April 1995) is a Russian-Canadian Professional boxer. As an amateur, he won a gold medal at the 2015 Pan American Games as well as representing Canada at the 2016 Summer Olympics.

== Early life ==
Biyarslanov's family left Chechnya when he was four years old due to ongoing violence. He migrated to Toronto from Azerbaijan at age 10 and started boxing in 2007 after his brother recommended the sport for self-defense.

== Amateur career ==
=== Olympic result ===
Rio 2016

- Round of 32: Defeated Obada Al-Kasbeh (Jordan) 3–0
- Round of 16: Defeated by Artem Harutyunyan (Germany) 2–0

=== World Championship results ===
Doha 2015

- Round of 32: Defeated by Lorenzo Sotomayor (Azerbaijan) 3–0

Hamburg 2017

- Round of 32: Defeated Evaldas Petrauskas (Lithuania) 3-0
- Round of 16: Defeated by Elvis Rodriguez (Dominican Republic) 3–2

=== Pan American Games result ===
Toronto 2015

- Quarter-finals: Defeated Lucas Gimenez (Argentina) 3–0
- Semi-finals: Defeated Luis Arcon (Venezuela) 3–0
- Final: Defeated Yasniel Toledo (Cuba) 2–1

== Professional career ==
On 15 December 2018, Biyarslanov made his professional debut against the Mexican Ernesto Cardona Sanchez. Biyarslanov won the fight in the opening round after trapping Sanchez against the ropes and landing a combination of punches to the head and body which sent his opponent to the canvas. On 9 February 2019, Biyarslanov fought in his second professional fight against Issac Castan. Biyarslanov secured his second professional win after knocking his opponent down three times in the opening round.

On 29 March 2019, it was announced that Biyarslanov had signed a deal with Matchroom Sport where he would be promoted by Eddie Hearn. On 20 April 2019, Biyarslanov fought against the experienced Cristian Arrazola. In the first round, Biyarslanov landed a combination of punches which forced his opponent to take a knee; Arrazola beat the count but was immediately put back on the canvas by a right hand. Arrazola beat the count again but referee Mark Simmons stopped the bout at the end of the opening round after he deemed Arrazola unfit to carry on.

== Professional boxing record ==
21 fights	21 wins	0 losses
By knockout	17	0
By decision	4	0

No.	Result	Record	Opponent	Type	Round, time	Date	Location	Notes
21	Win	21–0	Jimerr Espinosa	TKO	7 (10), 1:31	9 Apr 2026	Montreal Casino, Montreal, Canada	Retained NABF super lightweight title
20	Win	20–0	Sergey Lipinets	UD	10	30 Oct 2025	Montreal Casino, Montreal, Canada	Retained NABF super lightweight title
19	Win	19–0	Antonio Collado	TKO	3 (10), 0:38	5 Jun 2025	Montreal Casino, Montreal, Canada	
18	Win	18–0	Mohamed Mimoune	TKO	2 (10), 2:16	6 Feb 2025	Montreal Casino, Montreal, Canada	Retained NABF super lightweight title
17	Win	17–0	Jonathan Jose Eniz	UD	10	17 Oct 2024	Casino du Lac-Leamy, Gatineau, Canada	Retained NABF super lightweight title
16	Win	16–0	Tamas Kiliti	TKO	3 (10), 1:38	5 Sep 2024	Montreal Casino, Montreal, Canada	Retained NABF super lightweight title
15	Win	15–0	Elias Mauricio Haedo	KO	4 (10), 2:59	6 Jun 2024	Montreal Casino, Montreal, Canada	Won vacant NABF super lightweight title
14	Win	14–0	Cristian Palma	TKO	3 (8), 3:00	7 Mar 2024	Montreal Casino, Montreal, Canada	
13	Win	13–0	Joniker Tovar	RTD	4 (10), 3:00	22 Jul 2023	Dubai Studio City, Dubai, United Arab Emirates	
12	Win	12–0	Erick Encinia	TKO	4 (8), 1:53	18 Mar 2023	Halifax, Canada	
11	Win	11–0	Issouf Kinda	KO	1 (10), 1:05	29 Jul 2022	Montreal Casino, Montreal, Canada	
10	Win	10–0	Roberto Verdugo	TKO	4 (10), 1:00	25 Mar 2022	Colisée, Trois-Rivières, Canada	
9	Win	9–0	Alan Ayala	TKO	1 (8), 2:40	17 Dec 2021	Bell Centre, Montreal, Canada	
8	Win	8–0	Israel Mercado	MD	8	17 Apr 2021	Seminole Hard Rock Hotel and Casino, Hollywood, Florida, U.S.	
7	Win	7–0	Juan Jose Martinez Alvarez	TKO	1 (6), 0:59	7 Nov 2020	Seminole Hard Rock Hotel and Casino, Hollywood, Florida, U.S.	
6	Win	6–0	Nicolas Atilio Velazquez	KO	3 (6), 0:37	30 Jan 2020	Meridian at Island Gardens, Miami, Florida, U.S.	
5	Win	5–0	Tyrone Jones	UD	6	12 Oct 2019	Wintrust Arena, Chicago, Illinois, U.S.	
4	Win	4–0	Solon Staley	TKO	3 (4), 1:18	27 Jul 2019	College Park Center, Arlington, Texas, U.S.	
3	Win	3–0	Cristian Arrazola	TKO	1 (6), 2:52	20 Apr 2019	Danforth Music Hall, Toronto, Ontario, Canada	
2	Win	2–0	Isaac Castan	TKO	1 (4), 3:00	9 Feb 2019	Peterborough Memorial Centre, Peterborough, Canada	
1	Win	1–0	Ernesto Cardona Sanchez	KO	1 (4), 2:34	15 Dec 2018	Coca-Cola Coliseum, Toronto, Canada	
