= Ikboljon Kholdarov =

Uzbekistani boxer (born 1997)

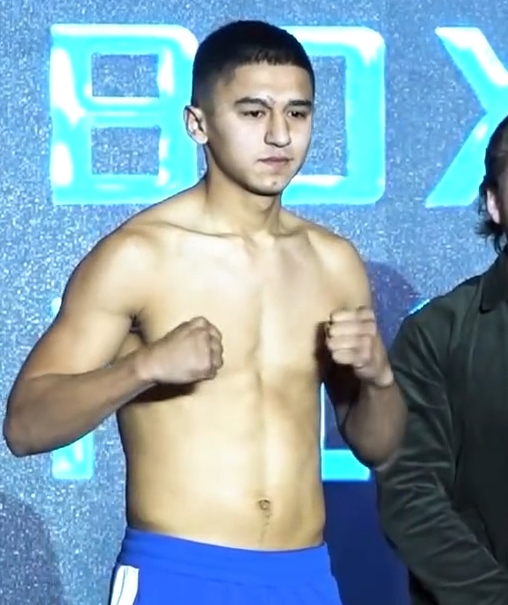
- Kholdarov in 2021

Personal information
- Born: 8 March 1997 (age 29) Andijan, Uzbekistan

Sport
- Country: Uzbekistan
- Sport: Boxing
Medal record
Men's amateur boxing
Representing Uzbekistan
World Amateur Championships
Silver medal – second place	2017 Hamburg	Light welterweight
Asian Games
Gold medal – first place	2018 Jakarta	Light welterweight
Asian Championships
Gold medal – first place	2017 Tashkent	Light welterweight

Ikboljon Kholdarov (born 8 March 1997) is an Uzbekistani boxer. He won the gold medal in the men's 64 kg event at the 2018 Asian Games.

In 2017, he won the gold medal in the men's 64 kg event at the Asian Amateur Boxing Championships.

At the 2017 AIBA World Boxing Championships, he won the silver medal in the light welterweight event.

== Professional boxing record ==
7 fights	7 wins	0 losses
By knockout	6	0
By decision	1	0

No.	Result	Record	Opponent	Type	Round, time	Date	Location	Notes
7	Win	7–0	Argen Kadyrbek uulu	TKO	5 (6), 2:18	26 Oct 2025	Bishkek Arena, Bishkek, Kyrgyzstan	
6	Win	6–0	Jamshidbek Tojiboev	RTD	3 (8), 3:00	17 Aug 2024	Bogishamol Bobur Park, Andijan, Uzbekistan	
5	Win	5–0	Eleazar Valenzuela	TKO	1 (8), 1:32	15 Apr 2023	Auditorio Municipal, Tijuana, Mexico	
4	Win	4–0	Celemente Agundez	TKO	3 (6), 1:46	20 Aug 2022	Centro de Convenciones CEART, Mexicali, Mexico	
3	Win	3–0	Ramón Barajas	UD	6	21 May 2022	Centro de Convenciones CEART, Mexicali, Mexico	
2	Win	2–0	Dzmitry Miliusha	TKO	1 (6), 2:44	17 Dec 2021	Hotel Renaissance, Tashkent, Uzbekistan	
1	Win	1–0	Kulwa Bushiri	TKO	2 (6), 1:13	3 Apr 2021	Humo Arena, Tashkent, Uzbekistan	
