= Luis Arcon =

Venezuelan boxer (born 1992)

Luís Arcón
Personal information
- Full name: Luís Martín Arcón Díaz
- Born: 1 June 1992 (age 34) Valle de la Pascua, Venezuela

Sport
- Sport: Boxing
Medal record
Men's amateur boxing
Representing Venezuela
Pan American Games
Bronze medal – third place	2015 Toronto	Light welterweight
Central American and Caribbean Games
Bronze medal – third place	2014 Veracruz	Light welterweight

Luís Martín Arcón Díaz (born 1 June 1992), known as Luís Arcón, is a Venezuelan boxer. Arcón competed in the men's light welterweight event at the 2016 Summer Olympics. He won bronze medals in the same weight class at the 2015 Pan American Games and the 2014 Central American and Caribbean Games.

== Professional boxing record ==
12 fights	11 wins	0 losses
By knockout	11	0
Draws	1	

No.	Result	Record	Opponent	Type	Round, time	Date	Location	Notes
12	Win	11–0–1	(Venezuela) Daniel Briceno	KO	1 (8), 2:35	20, December 2020	Coliseo Pedro Cuggia, Caracas, Venezuela	
11	Draw	10–0-1	(United States) Abram Martinez	SD	8 (8)	29 August 2020	(United States) Microsoft Theater, Los Angeles, California, U.S.	
10	Win	10–0	(Venezuela) Jasond Prado	TKO	1 (8), 1:01	13 December 2019	Gimnasio Vertical El Dorado, Caracas, Venezuela	
9	Win	9–0	(Croatia) Luka Leskovic	KO	5 (8), 1:18	19 October 2019	(Belgium) Spiroudome Arena, Charleroi, Hainaut, Belgica	
8	Win	8–0	(Argentina) Mario Ezequiel Sayal Lozano	KO	3 (6), 1:10	12 July 2019	(United States) Encore Boston Harbor, Everett, Massachusetts, U.S.	
7	Win	7–0	(Argentina) Jose Aubel	TKO	4 (6), 2:36	10 May 2019	(United States) MGM Springfield, Springfield, Massachusetts, U.S.	
6	Win	6–0	(United States) Zack Ramsey	TKO	2 (6), 1:39	29 March 2019	(United States) Memorial Hall, Melrose, Massachusetts, U.S.	
5	Win	5–0	(Venezuela) Jose Leonardo Morocoima	TKO	1 (6), 0:25	22 Dec 2018	Plaza Santiago Marino, Turmero, Venezuela	
4	Win	4–0	(Venezuela) Francisco Alvarez	TKO	1 (6), 0:59	14 Dec 2018	(United States) Centro Recreacional Yesterday, Turmero, Venezuela	
3	Win	3–0	(Venezuela) Maicol Vera	TKO	3 (6), 1:58	11 August 2018	Gimnasio Luis Beltran Diaz, Maracay, Venezuela	
2	Win	2–0	(Mexico) Ricardo Alan Fernandez	RTD	2 (4), 3:00	14 June 2018	(United States) Fantasy Springs Casino, Indio, U.S.	
1	Win	1–0	(Mexico) Dario Medina	TKO	1 (4), 2:39	25 March 2018	(Mexico) Rancho Grande Bar, Tijuana, Baja California, México	
