= Maxim Dadashev =

Russian boxer (1990–2019)

- Born: September 30, 1990; Leningrad, Russian SFSR, Soviet Union
- Died: July 23, 2019 (aged 28); Cheverly, Maryland, U.S.
- Education: Baltic State Technical University
- Boxing career
- Nickname: Mad Max
- Height: 5 ft 9 in (175 cm)
- Weight: Light-welterweight
- Reach: 70 in (178 cm)

Boxing record
- Total fights: 14
- Wins: 13
- Win by KO: 11
- Losses: 1
Medal record
Men's amateur boxing
Representing Russia
Youth World Championships
Silver medal – second place	2008 Guadalajara	Featherweight

Maxim Kaibkhanovich Dadashev (Russian: Максим Каибханович Дадашев; Lezgian: Дадашрин Къаибханан хва Максим; September 30, 1990 – July 23, 2019) was a Russian boxer who competed in the light-welterweight (63.5 kg) division. A participant of the 2015 European Games, Dadashev was a Russian amateur champion. Born in Leningrad, Soviet Union (now Saint Petersburg, Russia), he was of Lezgin descent.

== Amateur career ==
As an amateur, Dadashev was the 2008 Youth World Championships silver medalist at 57 kilograms (126 lb) in Guadalajara, Mexico. Dadashev continued his amateur career into college; he studied at Baltic State Technical University and graduated with a degree in sports management. In 2010 and 2012, Dadashev was the Russian National Championships bronze medalist at 60 kilograms (130 lb), and also was the 2013 Russian National Championships silver medalist at 64 kilograms (141 lb).

== Professional career ==
Trained by former world champion Buddy McGirt in Oxnard, California, Dadashev won his first 13 professional bouts, 11 of them knockouts or technical knockouts. In his professional debut in April 2016, he won with a first-round knockout of Darin Hampton. Dadashev won the vacant WBC-NABF light-welterweight title in June 2018 with a tenth-round stoppage of Darleys Pérez, and defended it in October 2018 with a ten-round decision win over former WBC lightweight champion Antonio DeMarco.

== Death ==
On July 19, 2019, Dadashev fought Subriel Matías as part of a Top Rank event aired by ESPN at the MGM National Harbor in Oxon Hill, Maryland. The fight was an IBF light-welterweight title elimination bout with the winner receiving a shot at the title. Dadashev lost via stoppage after his trainer, Buddy McGirt, asked the referee to stop the contest at the end of the eleventh round. Dadashev, losing significantly on the official scorecards, protested but McGirt overruled him believing that he could not take any more punishment; McGirt later said he had considered doing so two rounds earlier as he felt his fighter was fading and taking too many hits.

Dadashev needed help to get out of the ring and was unable to make it to his dressing room before he collapsed and vomited in the corridor. He was rushed to the University of Maryland Prince George's Hospital Center, where he was diagnosed with a subdural hematoma and underwent emergency surgery to stop the bleeding. He was then placed in an induced coma to try to allow the swelling in his brain to subside. However, Dadashev's condition worsened and on July 23 he died in the hospital. He is survived by his wife, Elizaveta, and a son.

=== Aftermath ===
The Boxing Federation of Russia launched an investigation into the tragedy, and pledged to support Dadashev's family financially. The Maryland State Athletic Commission announced it would also conduct an investigation. An investigator called McGirt and asked what he saw that officials didn't that made him stop the fight. McGirt hung up.

Dadashev's body was sent to his hometown of Saint Petersburg, Russia, for funeral services and burial. Bob Arum, who promoted the boxing match for his Top Rank, Inc., paid funeral expenses since medical expenses are the responsibility of the promoter under the Professional Boxing Safety Act of 1996, and a GoFundMe page was set up to raise funds for Dadashev's wife and son. His funeral took place in Petergof on August 4.

== Professional boxing record ==
14 fights	13 wins	1 loss
By knockout	11	1
By decision	2	0

No.	Result	Record	Opponent	Type	Round, time	Date	Age	Location	Notes
14	Loss	13–1	Subriel Matías	RTD	11 (12), 3:00	Jul 19, 2019	28 years, 292 days	MGM National Harbor, Oxon Hill, Maryland, U.S.	Dadashev died from injuries sustained during the bout
13	Win	13–0	Ricky Sismundo	KO	4 (10), 2:50	Mar 23, 2019	28 years, 174 days	The Hangar, Costa Mesa, California, U.S.	
12	Win	12–0	Antonio DeMarco	UD	10	Oct 20, 2018	28 years, 20 days	Park Theater, Paradise, Nevada, U.S.	Retained WBC-NABF light-welterweight title
11	Win	11–0	Darleys Pérez	TKO	10 (10), 1:49	Jun 9, 2018	27 years, 252 days	MGM Grand Garden Arena, Paradise, Nevada, U.S.	Won vacant WBC-NABF super lightweight title
10	Win	10–0	Abdiel Ramírez	TKO	5 (8), 2:11	Mar 10, 2018	27 years, 161 days	StubHub Center, Carson, California, U.S.	
9	Win	9–0	Clarence Booth	KO	4 (8), 1:26	Nov 11, 2017	27 years, 42 days	Save Mart Arena, Fresno, California, U.S.	
8	Win	8–0	Jose Marrufo	KO	8 (8), 1:32	Aug 5, 2017	26 years, 309 days	Microsoft Theater, Los Angeles, California, U.S.	
7	Win	7–0	Bilal Mahasin	KO	3 (8), 2:09	Apr 22, 2017	26 years, 204 days	StubHub Center, Carson, California, U.S.	
6	Win	6–0	Jerome Rodriguez	KO	6 (6), 1:14	Jan 27, 2017	26 years, 119 days	Sportsmans Lodge, Studio City, California, U.S.	
5	Win	5–0	Efrain Cruz	TKO	2 (6), 1:57	Nov 26, 2016	26 years, 57 days	Cosmopolitan of Las Vegas, Paradise, Nevada, U.S.	
4	Win	4–0	Eddie Diaz	UD	6	Oct 14, 2016	26 years, 14 days	Sportsmans Lodge, Studio City, California, U.S.	
3	Win	3–0	Jason Gavino	TKO	4 (6), 1:29	Jul 16, 2016	25 years, 290 days	Pioneer Event Center, Lancaster, California, U.S.	
2	Win	2–0	Rashad Bogar	KO	4 (6), 0:34	May 14, 2016	25 years, 227 days	Sportsmans Lodge, Studio City, California, U.S.	
1	Win	1–0	Darin Hampton	KO	1 (4), 2:52	Apr 2, 2016	25 years, 185 days	Oceanview Pavilion, Port Hueneme, California, U.S.	

== See also ==
- List of deaths due to injuries sustained in boxing
- Traumatic brain injury

Sporting positions
Regional boxing titles
Vacant Title last held by Regis Prograis	WBC-NABF light-welterweight champion June 9, 2018 – March 2019	Vacant Title next held by Luis Feliciano
