= Luis Feliciano =

American boxer

Personal information
- Born: Milwaukee, Wisconsin, U.S.
- Height: 5 ft 9 in (175 cm)
- Weight: Light welterweight

Boxing career
- Stance: Orthodox

Boxing record
- Total fights: 16
- Wins: 16
- Win by KO: 8

Luis Feliciano is an American professional boxer who has held the WBC-NABF super lightweight title since 2019.

== Professional career ==
After getting his bachelors from Marquette University, Feliciano made his professional debut on February 17, 2017, scoring a six-round unanimous decision (UD) victory over Angel Rodriguez at the Belasco Theater in Los Angeles, California.

After compiling a record of 12–0 (8 KOs) he faced Genaro Gamez for the vacant WBC-NABF super lightweight title on August 22, 2019, at the Fantasy Springs Resort Casino in Indio, California. Feliciano captured his first professional title via UD in a mostly one-sided fight, with one judge scoring the bout 99–91 and the other two scoring it 98–92. He returned to the Fantasy Springs Resort Casino on December 13 to successfully defend his title against Herbert Acevedo. In a fight which saw Acevedo knocked down heavily in the third round, Feliciano won by UD over ten rounds with the judges' scorecards reading 100–89, 99–90, and 97–92.

== Professional boxing record ==
18 fights	17 wins	1 loss
By knockout	8	1
By decision	9	0

Result	Record	Opponent	Type	Round, time	Date	Location	Notes
Loss	17-1	Mykquan Williams	KO	6	January 17, 2024	Whitesands Event Center, Plant City	WBA Continental (Super lightweight title)
Win	17-0	Clarence Booth	UD	8	April 1, 2023	Fiserv Forum Milwaukee	
Win	16-0	Alejandro Frias Rodriguez	MD	8	August 8, 2022	Commerce Casino, Commerce	
Win	15-0	Hector Colin	UD	10	May 6, 2022	Gimnasio Juan Francisco Estrada, Hermosillo	
14–0	Herbert Acevedo	UD	10	Dec 13, 2019	Fantasy Springs Resort Casino, Indio, California, U.S.	Retained WBC-NABF super lightweight title	
13–0	Genaro Gamez	UD	10	Aug 22, 2019	Fantasy Springs Resort Casino, Indio, California, U.S.	Won vacant WBC-NABF super lightweight title	
12–0	Fernando Carcamo	KO	7 (10), 2:16	Jun 21, 2019	Fantasy Springs Resort Casino, Indio, California, California, U.S.		
11–0	Daniel Sostre	KO	3 (10), 2:52	Apr 13, 2019	Complejo Ferial de Puerto Rico, Ponce, Puerto Rico		
10–0	Alexander Charneco	UD	6	Feb 16, 2019	Complejo Ferial de Puerto Rico, Ponce, Puerto Rico		
9–0	Dakota Polley	KO	7 (8), 2:08	Dec 8, 2018	Fantasy Springs Resort Casino, Indio, California, U.S.		
8–0	Jonathan Fortuna	KO	5 (8), 2:38	Aug 17, 2018	Fantasy Springs Resort Casino, Indio, California, U.S.		
7–0	Daniel Montoya	KO	4 (8), 0:50	Jun 14, 2018	Fantasy Springs Resort Casino, Indio, California, U.S.		
6–0	Miguel Canino	TKO	7 (8), 2:05	Apr 7, 2018	Complejo Ferial de Puerto Rico, Ponce, Puerto Rico		
5–0	William Lorenzo	TKO	5 (6), 1:40	Feb 3, 2018	Coliseo Ismael Delgado, Aguada, Puerto Rico		
4–0	Istvan Dernanecz	TKO	2 (6), 2:13	Oct 21, 2017	Turning Stone Resort Casino, Verona, New York, U.S.		
3–0	Jimmy Rosario	UD	6	Aug 18, 2017	Complejo Ferial de Puerto Rico, Ponce, Puerto Rico		
2–0	Baltazar Ramirez	UD	6	Jun 30, 2017	Fantasy Springs Resort Casino, Indio, California, U.S.		
1–0	Angel Rodriguez	UD	6	Feb 17, 2017	Belasco Theater, Los Angeles, California, U.S.		

Sporting positions
Regional boxing titles
Vacant Title last held by Maxim Dadashev	WBC-NABF super lightweight champion August 22, 2019 – present	Incumbent
