= Shohjahon Ergashev =

Uzbekistani boxer (born 1991)

Shohjahon Ergashev Шохжахон Эргашев
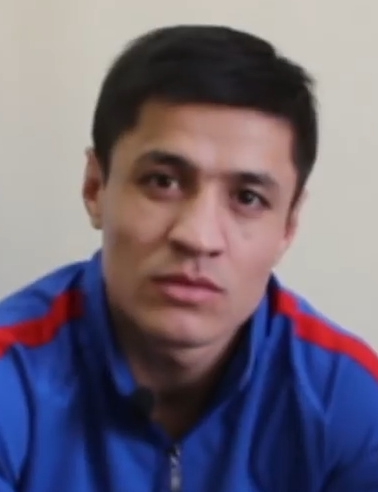
- Ergashev in 2018

Personal information
- Nickname: Descendant of Tamerlane
- Nationality: Uzbek
- Born: Shohjahon Abdusamiyevich Ergashev; 12 December 1991 (age 34) Fergana, Uzbekistan
- Height: 5 ft 10 1/2 in (179 cm)
- Weight: Light welterweight; Welterweight

Boxing career
- Reach: 71 in (180 cm)
- Stance: Southpaw

Boxing record
- Total fights: 28
- Wins: 26
- Win by KO: 23
- Losses: 2

Shohjahon Ergashev (born 12 December 1991) is an Uzbek professional boxer. He challenged for the IBF super-lightweight title in 2023.

== Background ==
Ergashev was born in Fergana, Uzbekistan. He was representing the National Team of Uzbekistan; his coach saw excellent results and talent in him and decided to check into professional boxing.

== Career ==
Ergashev had nine professional fights, all of which ended in stoppages, in Russia and then signed for Salita Promotions and subsequently moved to the USA. He had two successful fights against Marquis Hawthorne and Sonny Fredrickson where, he won both fights via technical knockout.

On 28 April 2018, Ergashev fought Zhimin Wang for the vacant WBC International super-lightweight title. Ergashev won the bout at the Barclays Center in New York City via unanimous decision.

On 25 November 2023 at Michelob Ultra Arena in Paradise, Nevada, Ergashev challenged Subriel Matías for the IBF super-lightweight title. He lost the fight via sixth round RTD.

On 28 March 2024 at Wayne State Fieldhouse in Detroit, Ergashev was scheduled to face Juan Huertas. He won by first round knockout.

Ergashev lost by split decision to Julian Smith at Little Caesars Arena in Detroit on 27 July 2024.

He got back to winning ways in his next fight, knocking Junju Power to the canvas three times before the bout was stopped in the first round at Samo Arena in Fergana on 15 February 2025.

On 4 January 2026, Ergashev knocked out Gurpreet Singh in the first round of their scheduled 10-round contest at Family Park Arena in Samarqand.

He is due to face Batyrzhan Jukembayev at Humo Arena in Tashkent on 9 May 2026.

== Professional boxing record ==
| 28 fights | 26 wins | 2 losses |
|---|---|---|
| By knockout | 23 | 1 |
| By decision | 3 | 1 |

| No. | Result | Record | Opponent | Type | Round, time | Date | Location | Notes |
|---|---|---|---|---|---|---|---|---|
| 28 | Win | 26–2 | (India) Gurpreet Singh | KO | 1 (10), ?:?? | 4 Jan 2026 | Family Park Arena, Samarqand, Uzbekistan | |
| 27 | Win | 25–2 | (Uganda) Junju Power | TKO | 1 (12), 2:34 | 15 Feb 2025 | Samo Arena, Fergana, Uzbekistan | |
| 26 | Loss | 24–2 | (United States) Julian Smith | SD | 10 | 27 Jul 2024 | (United States) Little Caesars Arena, Detroit, Michigan, US | |
| 25 | Win | 24–1 | (Panama) Juan Huertas | KO | 1 (10), 2:00 | 28 Mar 2024 | (United States) Wayne State Fieldhouse, Detroit, Michigan, US | |
| 24 | Loss | 23–1 | (Puerto Rico) Subriel Matías | RTD | 5 (12), 3:00 | 25 Nov 2023 | (United States) Michelob Ultra Arena, Paradise, Nevada, US | For IBF junior welterweight title |
| 23 | Win | 23–0 | (Mexico) Angel Martinez Hernandez | TKO | 5 (10), 1:24 | 10 Aug 2022 | (United States) Garden Theater, Detroit, Michigan, US | |
| 22 | Win | 22–0 | (Argentina) Luis Alberto Veron | UD | 8 | 26 May 2022 | (United States) Ford Community Center, Dearborn, Michigan, US | |
| 21 | Win | 21–0 | (Thailand) Aekkawee Kaewmanee | KO | 2 (10), 2:42 | 11 Dec 2021 | Hotel Renaissance, Tashkent, Uzbekistan | |
| 20 | Win | 20–0 | (Tanzania) Salimu Jengo | TKO | 1 (10), 0:37 | 11 Jun 2021 | Sport Palace Yunusabad, Tashkent, Uzbekistan | |
| 19 | Win | 19–0 | (Belarus) Dzmitry Miliusha | RTD | 2 (10), 3:00 | 16 Nov 2020 | Vegas City Hall, Krasnogorsk, Russia | |
| 18 | Win | 18–0 | (Mexico) Adrian Estrella | KO | 1 (10), 1:32 | 17 Jan 2020 | (United States) WinnaVegas Casino Resort, Sloan, Iowa, US | |
| 17 | Win | 17–0 | (Mexico) Abdiel Ramirez | TKO | 4 (10), 2:00 | 23 Aug 2019 | (United States) Central Park Community Center, Broken Arrow, Oklahoma, US | |
| 16 | Win | 16–0 | (United States) Mykal Fox | UD | 10 | 15 Feb 2019 | (United States) Kansas Star Casino, Mulvane, Kansas, US | |
| 15 | Win | 15–0 | (Argentina) Nazareno Gaston Ruiz | KO | 1 (10), 0:18 | 14 Dec 2018 | Olympus Arena, Krasnodar, Russia | |
| 14 | Win | 14–0 | (United States) Zack Ramsey | KO | 1 (6), 1:09 | 10 Nov 2018 | (United States) UIC Pavilion, Chicago, Illinois, US | |
| 13 | Win | 13–0 | (Uganda) Juma Waswa | RTD | 4 (10), 3:00 | 19 Aug 2018 | Korston Club, Moscow, Russia | |
| 12 | Win | 12–0 | (China) Zhimin Wang | UD | 10 | 28 Apr 2018 | (United States) Barclays Center, New York City, New York, US | Won vacant WBA International super-lightweight title |
| 11 | Win | 11–0 | (United States) Sonny Fredrickson | TKO | 3 (8), 1:58 | 12 Jan 2018 | (United States) Turning Stone Resort Casino, Verona, New York, US | |
| 10 | Win | 10–0 | (United States) Marquis Hawthorne | TKO | 2 (6), 0:41 | 11 Nov 2017 | (United States) Nassau Coliseum, Uniondale, New York, US | |
| 9 | Win | 9–0 | (Tajikistan) Sunatollo Rakhmatulloev | TKO | 1 (6), 0:50 | 10 Jun 2017 | Floyd Mayweather Boxing Academy, Zhukovka, Russia | |
| 8 | Win | 8–0 | (Uganda) Hamza Sempewo | TKO | 1 (10), 1:32 | 25 Mar 2017 | Qin Shi Huang Restaurant, Saint Petersburg, Russia | |
| 7 | Win | 7–0 | (Russia) Ruben Movsesyan | TKO | 1 (8), 1:05 | 15 Feb 2017 | Korston Club, Moscow, Russia | |
| 6 | Win | 6–0 | (Russia) Marat Khuzeev | TKO | 1 (6), 0:16 | 26 Aug 2016 | Tough Fight Gym, Moscow, Russia | |
| 5 | Win | 5–0 | (Uzbekistan) Dmitriy Antipov | TKO | 1 (8), 0:54 | 24 Jun 2016 | Sport Service, Podolsk, Russia | |
| 4 | Win | 4–0 | (Russia) Alisher Ashurov | KO | 2 (8), 2:45 | 1 Jun 2016 | Saturn Boxing Club, Saint Petersburg, Russia | |
| 3 | Win | 3–0 | (Azerbaijan) Elmin Safarli | KO | 6 (6), 0:22 | 26 Feb 2016 | Alexander Morozov Boxing School, Saint Petersburg, Russia | |
| 2 | Win | 2–0 | (Russia) Magomed Aldaganov | KO | 1 (4), 2:51 | 30 Jan 2016 | Platinum Night Club, Krasnodar, Russia | |
| 1 | Win | 1–0 | (Russia) Arzu Aliev | TKO | 1 (4), 1:38 | 23 Dec 2015 | Volta Club, Moscow, Russia | |
