= Joedison Teixeira =

Brazilian boxer (born 1994)

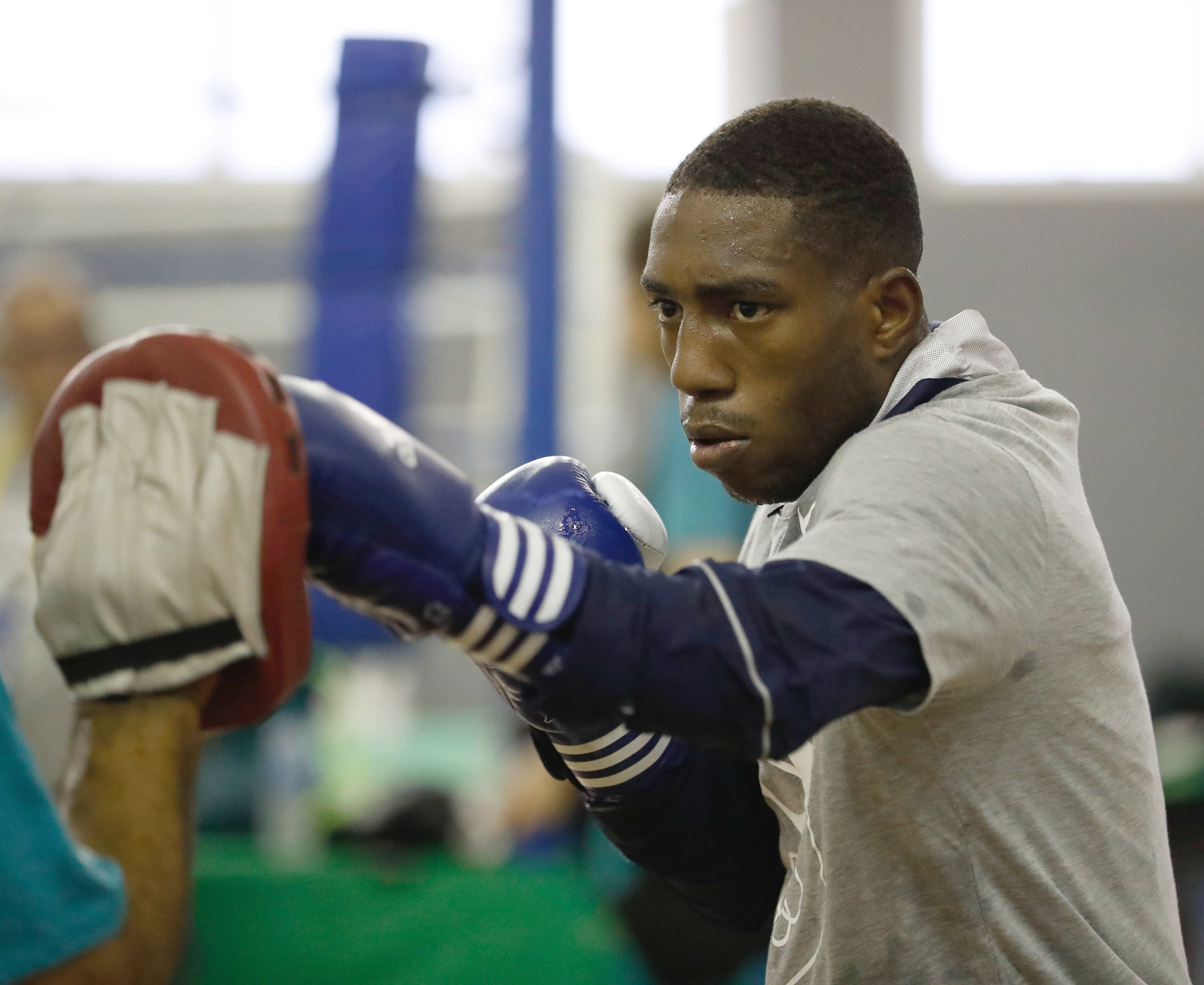
- Teixeira in 2016

Personal information
- Born: 28 January 1994 (age 32) Salvador, Bahia, Brazil
- Height: 172 cm (5 ft 8 in)

Sport
- Sport: Boxing
- Club: Marinha do Brasil
- Coached by: Messias Gomes
Medal record
Representing Brazil
Pan American Games
Bronze medal – third place	2015 Toronto	-60 kg
World Combat Games
Gold medal – first place	2013 Saint Petersburg	-64 kg

Joedison Teixeira de Jesus (born 28 January 1994) is a Brazilian amateur boxer who won a bronze medal at the 2015 Pan American Games. He qualified for the 2016 Summer Olympics in the 69 kg division.
