= Hassan Amzile =

French boxer (born 1988)

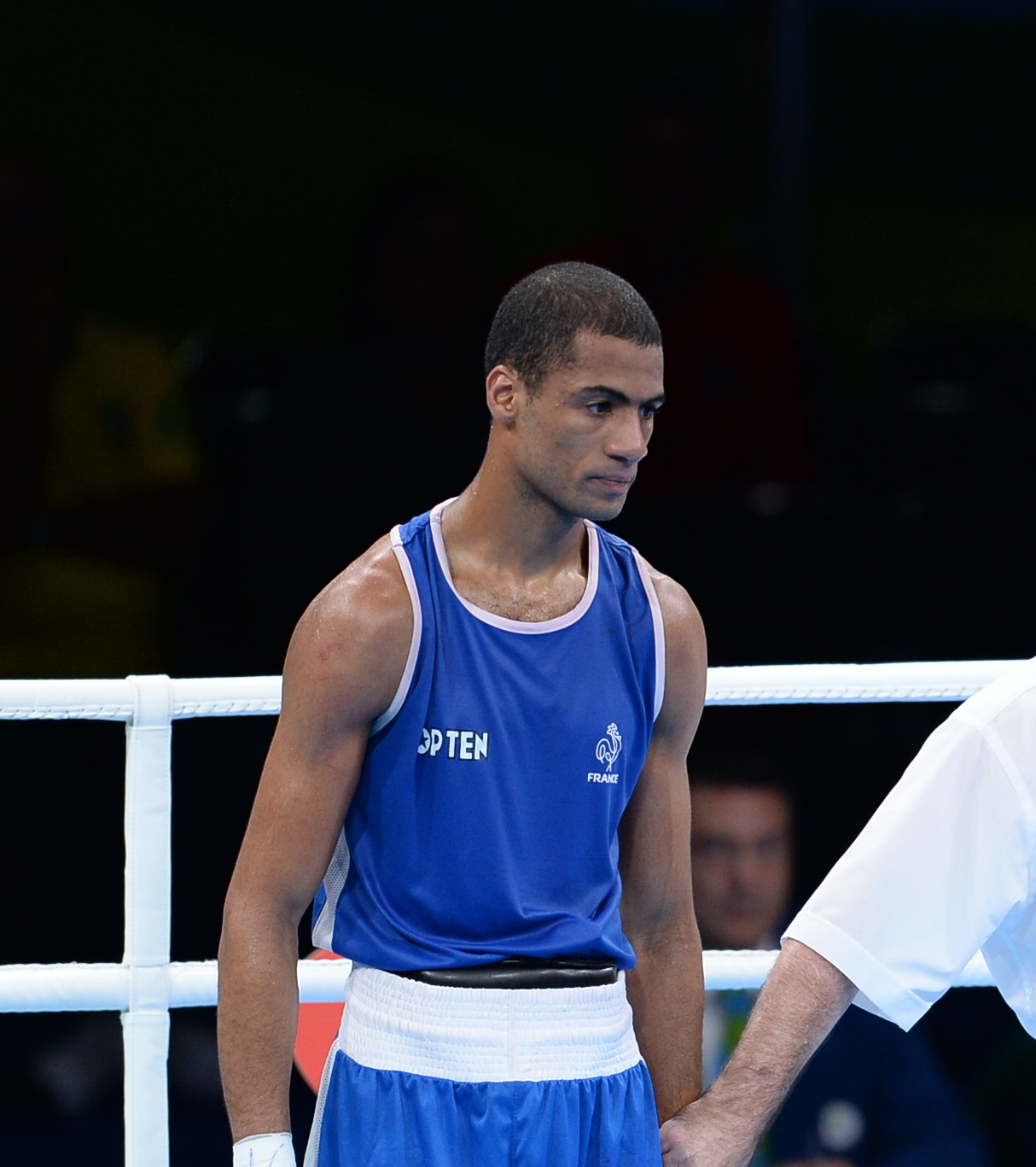
- Amzile at the 2016 Summer Olympics

Personal information
- Nationality: French
- Born: 5 June 1988 (age 38) Rueil-Malmaison, France
- Height: 1.73 m (5 ft 8 in)
- Weight: 64 kg (141 lb)

Boxing career

Boxing record
- Total fights: 18
- Wins: 11
- Win by KO: 3
- Losses: 7

Hassan Amzile (born 5 June 1988) is a French boxer. He competed in the men's light welterweight event at the 2016 Summer Olympics finishing ninth.

== Bout results ==
=== Personal results ===
Date	Opponent	Score	Result	Record
10 February 2017	(Morocco) Abdelhaq Nadir	0:3	Win	1–0
9 March 2017	(Italy) Ennio Zingaro	3:0	Win	2–0
6 April 2017	(England) Conor Loftus	3:0	Loss	2–1
11 May 2017	(England) Conor Loftus	0:3	Loss	2–2

=== Olympic results ===
Games	Phase	Match #	Rank	Opponent	Result
2016 Summer Olympics
2016 Rio	Round 2	7	2	(Azerbaijan) Lorenzo Sotomayor	loss
2016 Rio	Round 1	14	1	(Namibia) Jonas Junias Jonas	win by decision
