= Thulasi Tharumalingam =

German-Qatari boxer

Personal information
- Born: 24 October 1992 (age 33) Schwanewede, Germany

Boxing career

Thulasi Tharumalingam (born 24 October 1992) is a German-Qatari boxer of Sri Lankan Tamil descent. He competed in the men's light welterweight event at the 2016 Summer Olympics.
