= Wuttichai Masuk =

Thai boxer (born 1990)

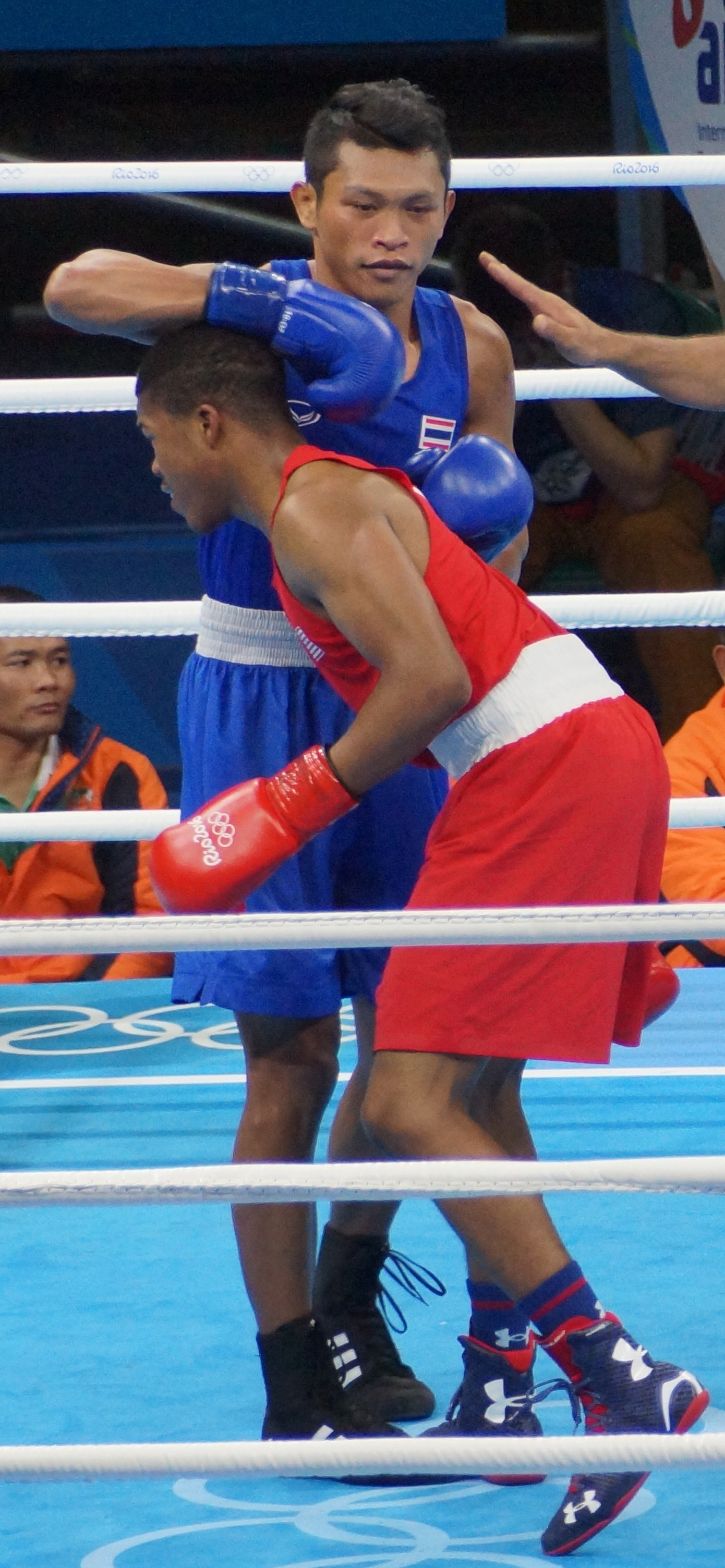
- Masuk (blue) at the 2016 Olympics

Personal information
- Nationality: Thai
- Born: 16 March 1990 (age 36) Nong Hong District, Buriram Province, Thailand
- Height: 175 cm (5 ft 9 in)

Sport
- Country: Thailand
- Sport: Boxing
- Weight class: Welterweight (2019); Light welterweight (2010–2017); Featherweight (2009)
- Club: Nakhonratchasima Municipality Sport School
- Coached by: Taweewat Islam; Omar Puentes Malagón
Medal record
World Amateur Championships
Bronze medal – third place	2015 Doha	Light welterweight
Asian Games
Gold medal – first place	2014 Incheon	Light welterweight
Bronze medal – third place	2010 Guangzhou	Light welterweight
Bronze medal – third place	2018 Jakarta–Palembang	Light welterweight
Asian Championships
Gold medal – first place	2009 Zhuhai	Featherweight
Gold medal – first place	2015 Bangkok	Light welterweight
Southeast Asian Games
Gold medal – first place	2013 Naypyidaw	Light welterweight
Gold medal – first place	2015 Singapore	Light welterweight
Gold medal – first place	2017 Malaysia	Light welterweight
Gold medal – first place	2019 Philippines	Welterweight
Bronze medal – third place	2009 Vientiane	Featherweight

Wuttichai Masuk (Thai: จ่าอากาศโท วุฒิชัย มาสุข; born 16 March 1990 at Buriram Province), is a Thai boxer who competes in the light welterweight division. He won the gold medal at the 2009 Asian Amateur Boxing Championships after defeating Hurshid Tojibaev of Uzbekistan. He also won gold medal of the Boxing at the 2014 Asian Games.

Masuk is also one of the most successful boxers in the Southeast Asian Games with four gold medals. He ruled the light welterweight division in the biennial multi-sport meet in 2013, 2015 and 2017 and added a fourth gold medal as a welterweight in 2019.

His brother Suthin is also an international boxer.
