= Vitaly Dunaytsev =

Russian boxer (born 1992)

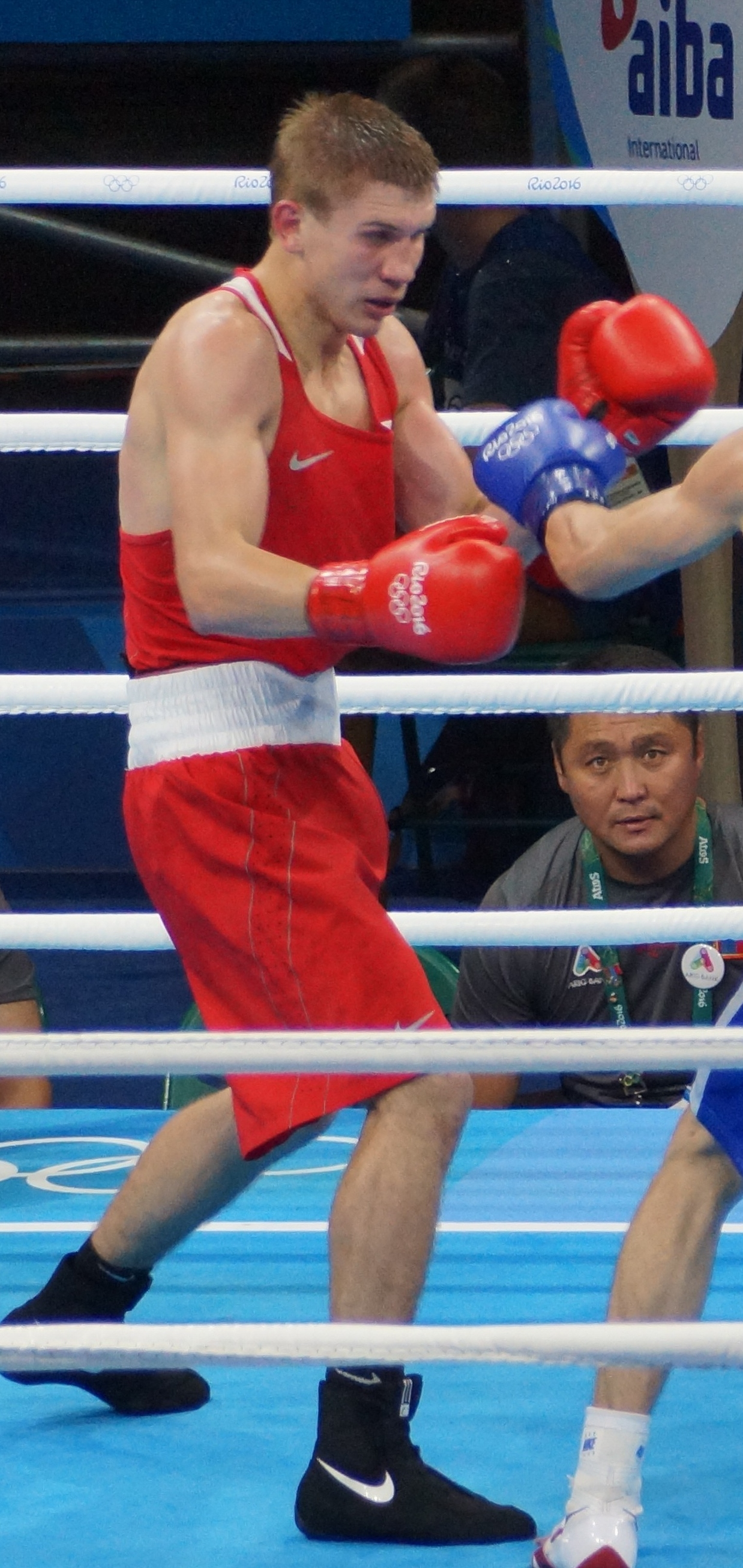
- Dunaytsev at the 2016 Olympics

Personal information
- Full name: Vitaly Vladimirovich Dunaytsev
- Nationality: Russian
- Born: 12 April 1992 (age 34) Kostanay, Kazakhstan
- Height: 174 cm (5 ft 9 in)

Sport
- Sport: Amateur boxing
- Club: Dynamo
- Coached by: Nikolay Bulgakov
Medal record
Representing Russia
Olympic Games
Bronze medal – third place	2016 Rio de Janeiro	Light welterweight
World Championships
Gold medal – first place	2015 Doha	Light welterweight
European Championships
Gold medal – first place	2015 Samokov	Light welterweight

Vitaly Vladimirovich Dunaytsev (Russian: Виталий Владимирович Дунайцев; born 12 April 1992) is a Russian amateur light welterweight boxer. He won gold medals at the 2015 World Championships and 2015 European Championships and a bronze medal at the 2016 Rio Olympics.

== Career ==
Dunaytsev was born in Kostanay, Kazakhstan, but the family moved in 2001 to Stary Oskol, Belgorod Oblast, Russia. His father is a retired competitive boxer. Dunaytsev first practiced judo, but after two years changed to boxing. He is a student of the Faculty of Law at the Belgorod University of Cooperation, Economics and Law. He is married to Valeria. Dunyatsev's first notable win was at the 2008 European Junior Championships in Plovdiv, Bulgaria, and in the following years he was quite successful in Youth and Junior National Championships.

Dunaytsev became a two-time Russian National champion (2013–2014) in light welterweight division. He won gold at the 2015 European Championships defeating Pat McCormack of Great Britain in the Finals and in October, Dunaytsev became World Champion in Light welterweight at the 2015 AIBA World Boxing Championships in Doha, Qatar.

On 15 December 2015, by the order of the Sports Minister of Russia, Dunaytsev received the honorary title "Merited Master of Sports". On 25 August 2016 he received the Medal of the Order "For Merit to the Fatherland" of 2nd degree.
