= Lorenzo Sotomayor =

Azerbaijani boxer

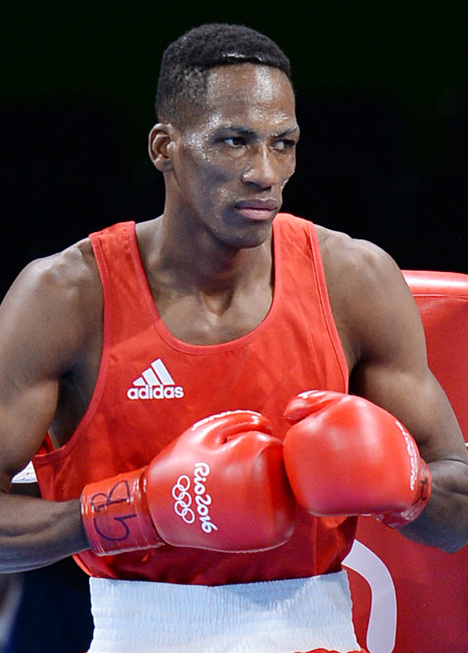
- Sotomayor at the 2016 Olympics

Personal information
- Full name: Lorenzo Sotomayor Collazo
- Nationality: Azerbaijani
- Born: 16 February 1985 (age 41) Havana, Cuba
- Education: Higher Institute of Physical Culture Manuel Fajardo
- Height: 1.85 m (6 ft 1 in)
- Weight: 64 kg (141 lb)

Sport
- Sport: Boxing
- Club: Gabala
- Coached by: Lazaro Martinez
Medal record
Men's amateur boxing
Representing Azerbaijan
Olympic Games
Silver medal – second place	2016 Rio de Janeiro	Light welterweight
European Games
Gold medal – first place	2015 Baku	Light welterweight
Bronze medal – third place	2019 Minsk	Welterweight

Lorenzo Sotomayor Collazo (born 16 February 1985) is a Cuban-born Azerbaijani light-welterweight boxer who won a silver medal at the 2016 Olympics. He is a nephew of the high jumper Javier Sotomayor. In 2013 he moved from Cuba to Azerbaijan to increase his chances for Olympic selection. He chose to compete as Collazo, which means "shining star".
