= 2013 AIBA World Boxing Championships – Lightweight =

Boxing competitions

The Lightweight competition at the 2013 AIBA World Boxing Championships was held from 15–26 October 2013. Boxers were limited to a weight of 60 kilograms.

== Medalists ==
Gold	Lázaro Álvarez (CUB)
Silver	Robson Conceição (BRA)
Bronze	Domenico Valentino (ITA)
Bronze	Berik Abdrakhmanov (KAZ)

== Seeds ==
1. (Italy) Domenico Valentino (semifinals)
2. (Uzbekistan) Fazliddin Gaibnazarov (third round)
3. (Tajikistan) Anvar Yunusov (second round)
4. (Brazil) Robson Conceição (final)
5. (Hungary) Miklós Varga (third round)
6. (Kazakhstan) Berik Abdrakhmanov (semifinals)
7. (Thailand) Sailom Adi (quarterfinals)
8. (Belarus) Vazgen Safaryants (second round)

== Draw ==
=== Finals ===
Semifinals
1	(Italy) Domenico Valentino	0
4	(Brazil) Robson Conceição	3
3	(Kazakhstan) Berik Abdrakhmanov	1
2	(Cuba) Lázaro Álvarez	2

Final
(Brazil) Robson Conceição	0
(Cuba) Lázaro Álvarez	3

=== Top half ===
==== Section 1 ====
First Round
(Nigeria) Oto Joseph	0
(Kosovo) Liridon Zeqiri	3
(Republic of Ireland) Seán McComb	3
(Israel) Almog Briga	0
(Azerbaijan) Elvin Isayev	3
(Bangladesh) Mohammad Amin	0

Second Round
(Italy) Domenico Valentino	3
(Kosovo) Liridon Zeqiri	0
(Seychelles) Andrique Allisop	0
(Mexico) Lindolfo Delgado	3
(Central African Republic) Gildas Bangana	0
(Republic of Ireland) Seán McComb	3
(Azerbaijan) Elvin Isayev	3
(Belarus) Vazgen Safaryants	0

Third Round
(Italy) Domenico Valentino	3
(Mexico) Lindolfo Delgado	0
(Republic of Ireland) Seán McComb	1
(Azerbaijan) Elvin Isayev	2

Quarterfinals
(Italy) Domenico Valentino	3
(Azerbaijan) Elvin Isayev	0

==== Section 2 ====
First Round
(Scotland) Charles Flynn	0
(Lithuania) Edgaras Skurdelis	3
(India) Vikash Malik	3
(Kyrgyzstan) Meder Mamakeev	0
(Australia) Timothy Locock	0
(Russia) Dmitry Polyanskiy	3
(Kenya) John Maitai	0
(Mongolia) Dorjnyambuu Otgondalai	3

Second Round
(Hungary) Miklós Varga	3
(Lithuania) Edgaras Skurdelis	0
(India) Vikash Malik	2
(Poland) Dawid Michelus	1
(Ukraine) Dmytro Cherniak	3
(Russia) Dmitry Polyanskiy	0
(Mongolia) Dorjnyambuu Otgondalai	1
(Brazil) Robson Conceição	2

Third Round
(Hungary) Miklós Varga	0
(India) Vikash Malik	3
(Ukraine) Dmytro Cherniak	0
(Brazil) Robson Conceição	3

Quarterfinals
(India) Vikash Malik	0
(Brazil) Robson Conceição	3

=== Bottom half ===
==== Section 3 ====
First Round
(Trinidad and Tobago) Michael Alexander	0
(Japan) Daisuke Narimatsu	3
(Venezuela) Luis Díaz	3
(Romania) Costin-Catalin Gheorghe	0
(Germany) Robert Harutyunyan	3
(Croatia) Matteo Komadina	0
(Puerto Rico) Danielito de la Rosa	3
(Georgia (country)) Giorgi Gogatishvili	0

Second Round
(Tajikistan) Anvar Yunusov	1
(Japan) Daisuke Narimatsu	2
(Venezuela) Luis Díaz	3
(Bulgaria) Elian Dimitrov	0
(Algeria) Mohamed Amine Ouadahi	1
(Germany) Robert Harutyunyan	2
(Puerto Rico) Danielito de la Rosa	1
(Kazakhstan) Berik Abdrakhmanov	2

Third Round
(Japan) Daisuke Narimatsu	1
(Venezuela) Luis Díaz	2
(Germany) Robert Harutyunyan	0
(Kazakhstan) Berik Abdrakhmanov	3

Quarterfinals
(Venezuela) Luis Díaz	1
(Kazakhstan) Berik Abdrakhmanov	2

==== Section 4 ====
First Round
(Turkmenistan) Faruh Yomudov	1
(Slovakia) Michal Zátorský	2
(Botswana) Kagiso Bagwasi	1
(South Korea) Lee Sang-Min	2
(United States) Kenneth Sims	3
(Sri Lanka) Sisira Gedara	0

Second Round
(Thailand) Sailom Adi	3
(Slovakia) Michal Zátorský	0
(South Korea) Lee Sang-Min	2
(Armenia) Hovhannes Bachkov	1
(Cuba) Lázaro Álvarez	3
(Wales) Joseph Cordina	0
(United States) Kenneth Sims	0
(Uzbekistan) Fazliddin Gaibnazarov	3

Third Round
(Thailand) Sailom Adi	3
(South Korea) Lee Sang-Min	0
(Cuba) Lázaro Álvarez	3
(Uzbekistan) Fazliddin Gaibnazarov	0

Quarterfinals
(Thailand) Sailom Adi	0
(Cuba) Lázaro Álvarez	3
