= 2015 AIBA World Boxing Championships – Lightweight =

Boxing competitions

The lightweight competition at the 2015 AIBA World Boxing Championships will be held from 7–15 October 2015. This is a qualifying tournament for the upcoming 2016 Summer Olympics. Lázaro Álvarez of Cuba defeated Albert Selimov of Azerbaijan to win the world title.

== Medalists ==
Gold	Lázaro Álvarez (CUB)
Silver	Albert Selimov (AZE)
Bronze	Elnur Abduraimov (UZB)
Bronze	Robson Conceição (BRA)

== Seeds ==
1. (Cuba) Lázaro Álvarez
2. (Brazil) Robson Conceição (Semifinals)
3. (Azerbaijan) Albert Selimov
4. (Mongolia) Otgondalai Dorjnyambuu (Quarterfinals)

== Draw ==
=== Finals ===
Semifinals
1	Lázaro Álvarez (CUB)	3
4	Elnur Abduraimov (UZB)	0
3	Albert Selimov (AZE)	3
2	Robson Conceição (BRA)	0

Final
Lázaro Álvarez (CUB)	TKO
Albert Selimov (AZE)

==== Section 1 ====
Round of 32
Pachanya Longchin (THA)	3
José Rosario (PUR)	0
Tymur Beliak (UKR)	3
Otar Eranosyan (GEO)	0
Daisuke Narimatsu (JPN)	3
Mahmoud Abdelaal (EGY)	0
Reda Benbaziz (ALG)	0
Elnur Abduraimov (UZB)	3
Enrico Lacruz (NED)	0
Domenico Valentino (ITA)	3

Round of 16
Lázaro Álvarez (CUB)	3
Pachanya Longchin (THA)	0
Tymur Beliak (UKR)	3
Daisuke Narimatsu (JPN)	0
Chad Milnes (NZL)	0
Elnur Abduraimov (UZB)	3
Domenico Valentino (ITA)	0
Otgondalai Dorjnyambuu (MGL)	3

Quarterfinals
Lázaro Álvarez (CUB)	3
Tymur Beliak (UKR)	0
Elnur Abduraimov (UZB)	3
Otgondalai Dorjnyambuu (MGL)	0

Semifinals
Lázaro Álvarez (CUB)	3
Elnur Abduraimov (UZB)	0

==== Section 2 ====
Round of 32
Lindolfo Delgado (MEX)	0
Seán McComb (IRL)	3
Sofiane Oumiha (FRA)	3
Elian Dimitrov (BUL)	0
Luis Cabrera (VEN)	3
Abdullatef Saqid (QAT)	0
Joseph Cordina (GBR)	3
Joshua Keirl (AUS)	0
Hassan Asuni (UGA)	1
Kwon Chol-guk (PRK)	2
Adlan Abdurashidov (RUS)	2
Zakir Safiullin (KAZ)	1

Round of 16
Albert Selimov (AZE)	2
Seán McComb (IRL)	1
Sofiane Oumiha (FRA)	3
Luis Cabrera (VEN)	0
Joseph Cordina (GBR)	3
Kwon Chol-guk (PRK)	0
Adlan Abdurashidov (RUS)	0
Robson Conceição (BRA)	3

Quarterfinals
Albert Selimov (AZE)	3
Sofiane Oumiha (FRA)	0
Joseph Cordina (GBR)	0
Robson Conceição (BRA)	3

Semifinals
Albert Selimov (AZE)	3
Robson Conceição (BRA)	0

== Results ==
=== Ranking ===
Rank	Athlete
1st place, gold medalist(s)	Lázaro Álvarez (CUB)
2nd place, silver medalist(s)	Albert Selimov (AZE)
3rd place, bronze medalist(s)	Elnur Abduraimov (UZB)
3rd place, bronze medalist(s)	Robson Conceição (BRA)
5	Tymur Beliak (UKR)
5	Otgondalai Dorjnyambuu (MGL)
5	Sofiane Oumiha (FRA)
5	Joseph Cordina (GBR)
9	Pachanya Longchin (THA)
9	Daisuke Narimatsu (JPN)
9	Chad Milnes (NZL)
9	Domenico Valentino (ITA)
9	Seán McComb (IRL)
9	Luis Cabrera (VEN)
9	Kwon Chol-guk (PRK)
9	Adlan Abdurashidov (RUS)
17	José Rosario (PUR)
17	Otar Eranosyan (GEO)
17	Mahmoud Abdelaal (EGY)
17	Reda Benbaziz (ALG)
17	Enrico Lacruz (NED)
17	Lindolfo Delgado (MEX)
17	Elian Dimitrov (BUL)
17	Abdullatef Saqid (QAT)
17	Joshua Keirl (AUS)
17	Hassan Asuni (UGA)
17	Zakir Safiullin (KAZ)
