= Albert Selimov =

Russian boxer (born 1986)

Albert Selimov Альберт Селимов
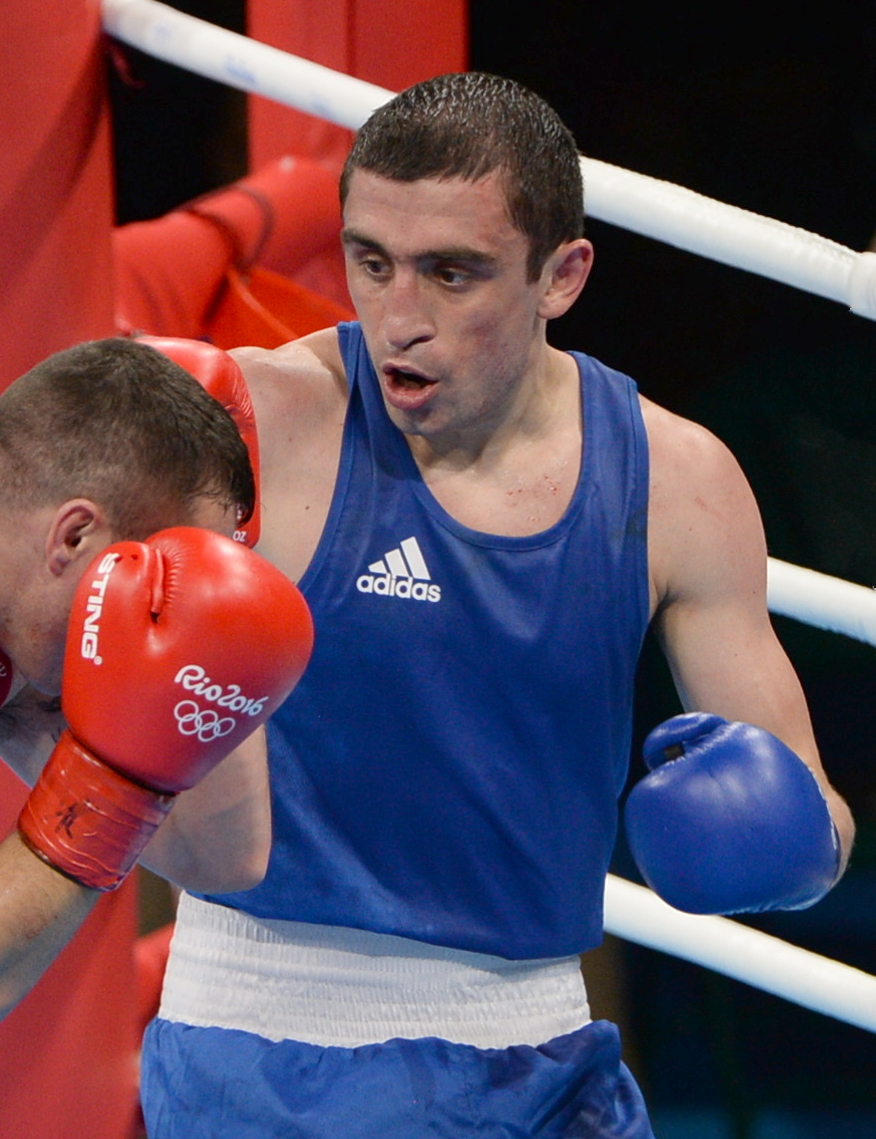
- Selimov at the 2016 Olympics

Personal information
- Full name: Альберт Шевкетович Селимов
- Nationality: Azerbaijani; Russian
- Born: 5 April 1986 (age 40) Kaspiysk, Dagestan, Russian SFSR, Soviet Union
- Education: Dagestan State University
- Height: 171 cm (5 ft 7 in)

Sport
- Sport: Boxing
- Club: Baku Fires
- Coached by: Nuripasha Talibov (club); Pedro Roqe (national)
Medal record
Representing Azerbaijan
World Amateur Championships
Silver medal – second place	2015 Doha	Lightweight
European Games
Gold medal – first place	2015 Baku	Lightweight
Representing Russia
World Amateur Championships
Gold medal – first place	2007 Chicago	Featherweight
Bronze medal – third place	2009 Milan	Lightweight
Boxing World Cup
Silver medal – second place	2006 Baku	Featherweight
Gold medal – first place	2008 Moscow	Lightweight
European Amateur Championships
Gold medal – first place	2006 Plovdiv	Featherweight
Gold medal – first place	2010 Moscow	Lightweight

Albert Shevketovich Selimov (Альберт Шевкетович Селимов; born 5 April 1986) is a Russian former amateur boxer of Lezgin descent. He is best known for being the only man to defeat Vasiliy Lomachenko in the amateur ranks. Competing for Russia, he won the 2007 world title, the 2008 World Cup, and two European titles, in 2006 and 2010. After failing to qualify for the 2012 Olympics, he moved to Azerbaijan and representing that country, placed second at the 2015 World Championships and fifth at the 2016 Summer Olympics.

== Career ==
At the 2006 European Championships he beat Stephen Smith in the semis and Shahin Imranov 28:10 in the final.

At the 2007 World Championships southpaw counterpuncher Selimov beat American southpaw Raynell Williams and won against Yakup Kılıç by walk-over to reach the finals. There he outlasted Ukrainian Vasiliy Lomachenko, another southpaw.

In the round one bout of the featherweight division at the 2008 Beijing Olympics, Lomachenko got his revenge and outclassed Selimov 16–11, cutting short Selimov's dream for Olympic gold. Selimov finished his amateur career with 253 fights under his belt, 236 wins, 17 losses.

=== Olympic Games ===
2008

- Lost to Vasiliy Lomachenko (Ukraine) 7–14

2016

- Defeated David Joyce (Ireland) 3–0
- Lost to Sofiane Oumiha (France) 0–3

=== World Championships ===
2007 (featherweight)

- Defeated Iulian Stan (Romania) RSC-1
- Defeated Marcel Herfuth (Germany) PTS
- Defeated Bahodirjon Sooltonov (Uzbekistan) 24–9
- Defeated Raynell Williams (United States) 25–8
- Defeated Yakup Kılıç (Turkey) walk-over
- Defeated Vasiliy Lomachenko (Ukraine) 16–11

2009 (lightweight)

- Defeated Mohammad Aziz (Afghanistan) 25–1
- Defeated Erick Bonez (Ecuador) 18–0
- Defeated Sailom Ardee (Thailand) 14–8
- Defeated Éverton Lopes (Brazil) 17–2
- Lost to José Pedraza (Puerto Rico) 5–9

2011 (lightweight)

- Lost to Héctor Manzanilla (Venezuela) DQ

2015 (lightweight)

- Defeated Seán McComb (Ireland) 2–1
- Defeated Sofiane Oumiha (France) 3–0
- Defeated Robson Conceição (Brazil) 3–0
- Lost to Lázaro Álvarez (Cuba) TKO (cuts)

=== Boxing World Cup ===
2006 (featherweight)

- Defeated Xie Longwang (China) 29–11
- Defeated Dmytro Bulenkov (Ukraine) RSCO 2
- Lost to Ibrahima Keita (Guinea) by walkover
- Lost to Yuriorkis Gamboa (Cuba) RET 3

2008 (lightweight)

- Defeated José Pedraza (Puerto Rico) 14–4
- Defeated Hu Qing (China) 12–10

=== European Championships ===
2006 (featherweight)

- Defeated Sandor Racz (Hungary) RSCO-2
- Defeated Edgar Manukyan (Armenia) RSCO-2
- Defeated Stephen Smith (England) RSCO-2
- Defeated Shahin Imranov (Azerbaijan) 28–10

=== European Games ===
2015 (lightweight)

- Defeated Otar Eranosyan (Georgia) 3–0
- Defeated Elian Dimitrov (Bulgaria) 3–0
- Defeated Seán McComb (Ireland) 3–0
- Defeated Sofiane Oumiha (France) 3–0
