= Robson Conceição =

Brazilian boxer (born 1988)

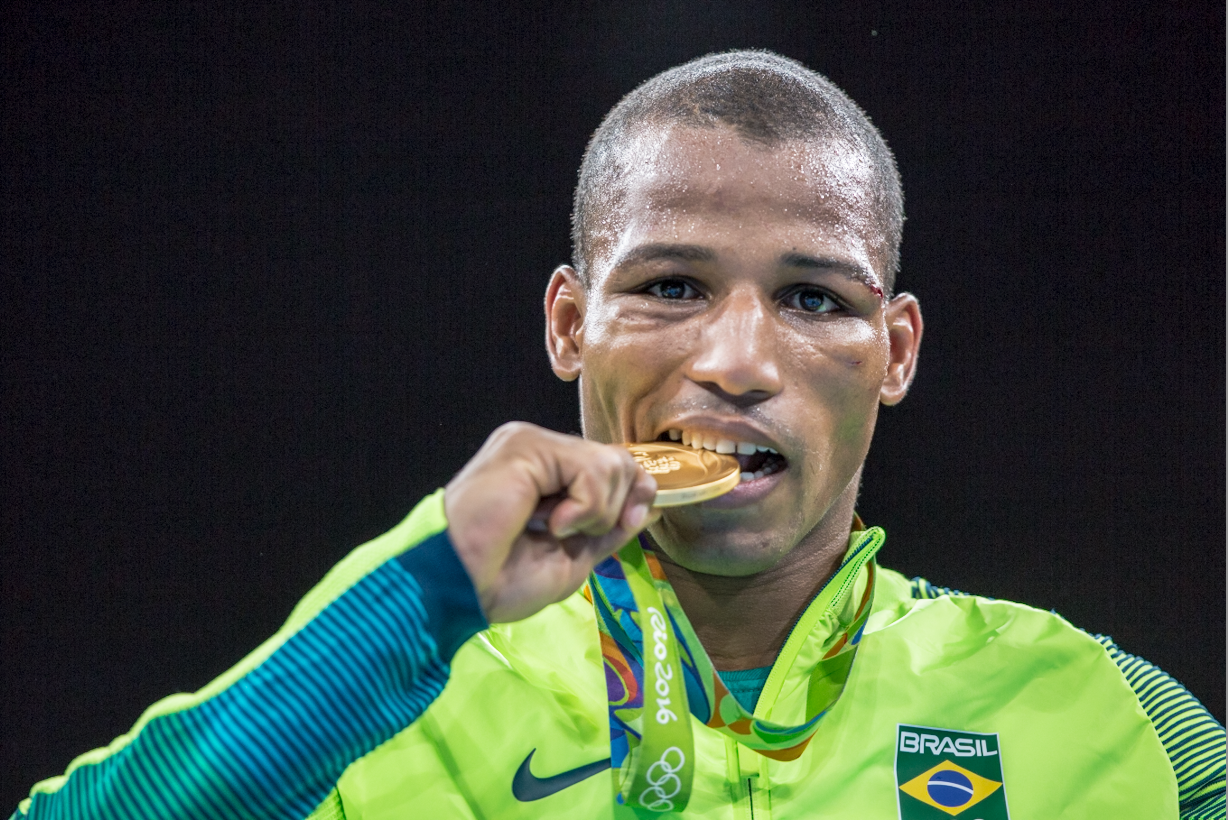
- Conceição at 2016 Summer Olympics

Personal information
- Nickname: Nino
- Born: Robson Donato Conceição; 25 October 1988 (age 37) Salvador, Bahia, Brazil
- Height: 5 ft 10 1/2 in (179 cm)
- Weight: Super featherweight

Boxing career
- Reach: 70 in (178 cm)
- Stance: Orthodox

Boxing record
- Total fights: 26
- Wins: 21
- Win by KO: 10
- Losses: 4
- Draws: 1
- No contests: 1
Medal record
Men's Amateur boxing
Representing Brazil
Olympic Games
Gold medal – first place	2016 Rio de Janeiro	Lightweight
World Championships
Silver medal – second place	2013 Almaty	Lightweight
Bronze medal – third place	2015 Doha	Lightweight
Pan American Games
Silver medal – second place	2011 Guadalajara	Lightweight

Robson Donato Conceição (/ˌkɒnseɪˈsaʊn/ kon-say-SOWN; Portuguese pronunciation: [kõsejˈsɐ̃w̃]; born 25 October 1988) is a Brazilian professional boxer who has held the World Boxing Council (WBC) super featherweight title in 2024. As an amateur, he became the first Brazilian boxer to win an Olympic gold medal at the 2016 Olympics.

== Amateur career ==
Born in Salvador, capital of the Brazilian state of Bahia, Conceição started boxing at the age of 13 to stand on his own in street fights. He had to walk 9 kilometers to his academy due to not having money for bus tickets, woke up early in the morning to help his grandmother who sold groceries, and helped his family by selling ice cream and being a kitchen helper. His first coach was Luiz Dórea, who also managed world champion Acelino Freitas, Olympic medallist Adriana Araújo, and MMA fighter Junior dos Santos.

Just four months after entering the Brazilian boxing team, Conceição fought the qualifiers for the 2008 Summer Olympics in Beijing. While he fell in the first American qualifier to Idel Torriente, Conceição won all fights to get an Olympic spot. He eventually lost his opening match to Li Yang.

After losing in the first round of the 2009 World Amateur Boxing Championships, in 2011, Conceição won two bouts before a close 18:19 decision to the eventual winner Vasyl Lomachenko. That same year, he got a silver medal at the 2011 Pan American Games, losing in the final to eventual Olympic medalist Yasniel Toledo and guaranteeing a second Olympic spot. During the Pan Ams, Conceição proposed to his girlfriend, fellow boxer Érica Matos, whom he married in 2013. The following year, the couple had a daughter, Sophia.

In the 2012 Summer Olympics in London, Conceição again lost his first match. Hoping to take part in the 2016 Summer Olympics that would be hosted in Brazil, Conceição did not turn professional, instead signing with the Brazilian Navy to gain the scholarship and training facilities reserved for military sportspersons. Conceição won a silver and a bronze medal at the 2013 and 2015 tournaments, the latter guaranteeing him the Olympic spot. Before the Olympics, in 2015 Pan American Championships in Vargas, Venezuela, he won the gold medal after beating Cuban Lázaro Álvarez in the final, in the quarterfinals (his first fight) he won a 3–0 decision against Lindolfo Delgado of Mexico; in the semifinals he won a 3–0 decision against Luis Angel Cabrera of Venezuela; in the finals he won a 3–0 decision against Lázaro Álvarez of Cuba. At the Olympics in Rio de Janeiro, Conceição won four fights, including against three-time world champion Lázaro Álvarez and European silver medallist Sofiane Oumiha, to become the first Brazilian boxer to win an Olympic gold medal.

After the 2016 Olympics, Conceição signed a professional promotion contract with Top Rank. He finished his amateur career with a record of 405–15.

== Professional career ==
Conceição's professional debut happened on November 5, 2016 in Las Vegas, as one of the undercards in the Manny Pacquiao vs. Jessie Vargas event. He won the fight by unanimous decision, with two scorecards of 60–54 and one scorecard of 60–53. Conceição next faced Aaron Ely on January 27, 2017. He won the fight by a second-round knockout, the first stoppage victory of his career. Conceição was then booked to face the over-matched Aaron Hollis on March 17, 2017. He once again won by a second-round knockout. Conceição had his first minor step-up in competition on July 21, 2017, when he faced Bernardo Gomez Uribe. He needed only 53 seconds to stop the Mexican. Conceição was booked to face Carlos Osorio on September 22, 2017, in his final fight of the year. Osorio retired from the fight at the end of the third round.

Conceição began his 2018 campaign by facing he undefeated prospect Ignacio Holguin on February 16, 2018. He won the fight by unanimous decision, with scores of 60–52, 60–52 and 60–54. Conceição next faced Alex Torres Rynn on April 28, 2018. He won the fight by unanimous decision, with all three judges scoring the fight 60–54 in his favor. Conceição faced Gavino Guaman on June 30, 2018, in his eight professional appearance. He won the fight by a third-round technical knockout. Conceição was then scheduled to face Edgar Cantu on August 25, 2018. He won the fight by unanimous decision, with all three judges awarding Conceição an 80–71 scorecard. Conceição faced Joey Laviolette on November 4, 2018, in his final fight of the year. He won the fight by unanimous decision, with all three judges scoring the fight 80–72 for the Brazilian.

Conceição fought thrice in 2019, with all three fights coming against journeymen opponents. On January 18, Conceição beat Hector Ambriz Suarez by a unanimous decision after eight rounds. Two months later, on March 31, 2019, Conceição stopped Sergio Ariel Estrela at the 1:54 minute mark of the first round. Conceição finished the year with a unanimous decision victory against Carlos Ruiz on June 8, 2019. Conceição was booked to face Eduardo Pereira dos Reis on August 29, 2020, following a 14-month absence from the sport. He won the fight by a second-round technical knockout. Conceição next faced Luis Coria on October 31, 2020. The fight was scheduled for the undercard of the Naoya Inoue-Jason Moloney bantamweight title clash. He won the fight by unanimous decision, with scores of 94–93, 95–92 and 95–92.

Conceição challenged the newly-minted WBC super featherweight champion Óscar Valdez on September 10, 2021, at the Casino Del Sol in Tucson, Arizona, United States. On August 31, it was revealed that Valdez had tested positive for the banned stimulant phentermine. On September 2, his B-sample tested positive as well. The fight with Conceição would still happen however, as the Pascua Yaqui Tribe Athletic Commission went by WADA guidelines, which only prohibit stimulants in-competition. Valdez won the fight by unanimous decision, with two judges awarding him a 115-112 scorecard, while the third judge scored it 117-110 for Valdez. Most media members scored the fight for Valdez.

On December 21, 2021, it was revealed that Conceição would face the unbeaten Xavier Martinez in a WBC super-featherweight title eliminator. The fight was scheduled as the main event of a January 29, 2022 Top Rank card, and was broadcast by ESPN and ESPN Deportes. He won the fight by unanimous decision, with scores of 98–92, 99–91 and 100–90. Conceição dominated the bout, with Martinez's sole moment of success coming at the end of the third round, when he briefly staggered Conceição.

Conceição was booked to face the unified WBC, WBO, and The Ring super featherweight champion Shakur Stevenson in the main event of an ESPN broadcast card, which took place on September 23, 2022, at the Prudential Center in Newark, New Jersey. He entered the fight as a heavy betting underdog, with most bookmakers having at -1800 odds. Stevenson missed weight by 1.6 lbs at the official weigh-ins and was stripped of his titles. In front of an audience of 10,107, Conceição lost the fight by unanimous decision, with two scorecards of 117–109 and one scorecard of 118–108.

Conceição faced Nicolas Polanco on June 10, 2023, on the undercard of the Josh Taylor and Teofimo Lopez super lightweight title bout. The fight ended in a no-contest, as Polanco was unable to rise from his stool at the start of the third round, due to a clash of heads in the prior round.

Conceição was scheduled to face Jose Ivan Guardado Ortiz on April 13, 2024 in Corpus Christi, Texas. He won the fight via seventh-round stoppage.

=== WBC Super Featherweight Champion ===
==== Conceição vs. Foster ====
Conceição was scheduled to challenge O'Shaquie Foster for his WBC super featherweight title at Prudential Center in Newark, New Jersey on July 6, 2024. Conceição won the fight by a very controversial split decision victory, with many believing Foster was the rightful winner. Others say the former champ was out hustled by Conceição.

==== Conceição vs. Foster 2 ====
On August 29, 2024 it was reported that Conceição would make the first defense of his WBC super featherweight title in a championship rematch against former champion O'Shaquie Foster on November 2, 2024 in Verona, New York. On September 9, 2024 the fight was confirmed to take place at Turning Stone Resort Casino in Verona, NY. Conceição lost by split decision.

==== Conceição vs. Muratalla ====
Conceição challenged IBF lightweight champion Raymond Muratalla at The Theater at Virgin Hotels in Las Vegas on August 1, 2026, losing by unanimous decision.

== Professional boxing record ==
27 fights	21 wins	4 losses
By knockout	10	0
By decision	11	4
Draws	1	
No contests	1	

No.	Result	Record	Opponent	Type	Round, time	Date	Location	Notes
27	Loss	21–4–1 (1)	Raymond Muratalla	UD	12	1 Aug 2026	The Theater at Virgin Hotels, Las Vegas, Nevada, U.S.	For IBF lightweight title
26	Win	21–3–1 (1)	Helber Rojas	UD	10	4 Apr 2026	Shopping Conjunto Nacional, Brasília, Brazil	
25	Win	20–3–1 (1)	Yonnaiquer Rondon	KO	6 (10), 0:05	2 Aug 2025	Ginasio da AABB, Brasília, Brazil	
24	Loss	19–3–1 (1)	O'Shaquie Foster	SD	12	2 Nov 2024	Turning Stone Resort Casino, Verona, New York, U.S.	Lost WBC super featherweight title
23	Win	19–2–1 (1)	O'Shaquie Foster	SD	12	6 Jul 2024	Prudential Center, Newark, New Jersey, U.S.	Won WBC super featherweight title
22	Win	18–2–1 (1)	Jose Ivan Guardado Ortiz	TKO	7 (8), 2:27	13 Apr 2024	American Bank Center, Corpus Christi, Texas, U.S.	
21	Draw	17–2–1 (1)	Emanuel Navarrete	MD	12	16 Nov 2023	T-Mobile Arena, Paradise, Nevada, U.S.	For WBO super featherweight title
20	NC	17–2 (1)	Nicolas Polanco	NC	2 (10), 3:00	10 Jun 2023	Hulu Theater at Madison Square Garden, New York City, New York, U.S.	Fight stopped after Polanco failed to answer bell following an accidental clash of heads
19	Loss	17–2	Shakur Stevenson	UD	12	23 Sep 2022	Prudential Center, Newark, New Jersey, U.S.	For vacant WBC, WBO, and The Ring super featherweight titles
18	Win	17–1	Xavier Martinez	UD	10	29 Jan 2022	Hard Rock Hotel & Casino, Tulsa, Oklahoma, U.S.	
17	Loss	16–1	Óscar Valdez	UD	12	10 Sep 2021	Casino del Sol, Tucson, Arizona, U.S.	For WBC super featherweight title
16	Win	16–0	Jesus Antonio Ahumada	TKO	7 (8), 1:20	10 Apr 2021	Osage Casino, Tulsa, Oklahoma, U.S.	
15	Win	15–0	Luis Coria	UD	10	31 Oct 2020	MGM Grand Conference Center, Paradise, Nevada, U.S.	
14	Win	14–0	Eduardo Pereira dos Reis	TKO	2 (10), 0:28	29 Aug 2020	Arena de Lutas, São Paulo, Brazil	
13	Win	13–0	Carlos Ruiz	UD	8	8 Jun 2019	Reno-Sparks Convention Center, Reno, Nevada, U.S.	
12	Win	12–0	Sergio Ariel Estrela	TKO	1 (10), 1:54	31 Mar 2019	Portobello Resort & Safari, Mangaratiba, Brazil	
11	Win	11–0	Hector Ambriz Suarez	UD	8	18 Jan 2019	Turning Stone Resort Casino, Verona, New York, U.S.	
10	Win	10–0	Joey Laviolette	UD	8	4 Nov 2018	Don Haskins Center, El Paso, Texas, U.S.	
9	Win	9–0	Edgar Cantu	UD	8	25 Aug 2018	Gila River Arena, Glendale, Arizona, U.S.	
8	Win	8–0	Gavino Guaman	TKO	3 (6), 0:53	30 Jun 2018	Chesapeake Energy Arena, Oklahoma City, Oklahoma, U.S.	
7	Win	7–0	Alex Torres Rynn	UD	6	28 Apr 2018	Liacouras Center, Philadelphia, Pennsylvania, U.S.	
6	Win	6–0	Ignacio Holguin	UD	6	16 Feb 2018	Grand Sierra Resort, Reno, Nevada, U.S.	
5	Win	5–0	Carlos Osorio	RTD	3 (8), 3:00	22 Sep 2017	Tucson Convention Center, Tucson, Arizona, U.S.	
4	Win	4–0	Bernardo Gomez Uribe	KO	1 (8), 0:53	21 Jul 2017	Sheraton Puerto Rico Hotel & Casino, San Juan, Puerto Rico	
3	Win	3–0	Aaron Hollis	TKO	2 (6), 0:36	17 Mar 2017	The Theatre at Madison Square Garden, New York City, New York, U.S.	
2	Win	2–0	Aaron Ely	KO	2 (6), 1:06	27 Jan 2017	Sportsmen's Lodge, Studio City, California, U.S.	
1	Win	1–0	Clay Burns	UD	6	5 Nov 2016	Thomas & Mack Center, Paradise, Nevada, U.S.	

== See also ==
- List of world super-featherweight boxing champions

Sporting positions
World boxing titles
Preceded by O'Shaquie Foster	WBC super featherweight champion July 6 – November 2, 2024	Succeeded by O'Shaquie Foster
