= Haithem Laamouz =

Maltese boxer

Personal information
- Nickname: The Flash
- Nationality: Maltese
- Born: 4 November 1989 (age 36) Sliema, Malta
- Height: 5 ft 7 in (1.70 m)
- Weight: Super featherweight Lightweight; Light welterweight

Boxing career
- Stance: Orthodox

Boxing record
- Total fights: 18
- Wins: 17
- Win by KO: 7
- Losses: 1

Haithem Laamouz (born 4 November 1989) is a Maltese professional boxer. He has held the European Union super featherweight title since December 2020, and previously the OPBF junior welterweight title in 2017. As an amateur, he represented his country in the lightweight event at the 2009 World Championships.

== Amateur career ==
Born and raised on the island of Malta, he began boxing at the age of 15. He also initially trained in mixed martial arts. He began training with former Commonwealth champion Scott Dixon in 2008. He represented his country at the 2009 World Championships in the lightweight event, where he lost his first match against 2016 Olympian Hu Qianxun. His first achievement was a gold medal in an England vs. Malta Club Tournament.

In 2010, he reached the quarter-finals of the Mohamed IV Tournament in Morocco, as well as the finals of the Haringey Box Cup in England. In 2012 he reached the finals of the Belfast Box Tournament in Belfast, where he lost to Seán McComb. He was also London Champion and a quarter-finalist in the England National Youth Championships. In 2013 and 2014 he won several tournaments in Sweden. He also defeated future Commonwealth featherweight champion Reece Bellotti in the finals of the 2014 Haringey Box Cup for his second consecutive title at the tournament.

He had dreams of qualifying for the Olympics but had no support from the Maltese federation. His amateur record was 52–10.

== Professional career ==
Laamouz moved to Batemans Bay, Australia to pursue his professional career. He made his pro debut on 27 March 2015, defeating former Irish amateur champion Gearoid Clancy by split decision (SD) in Sydney. He returned home for his second fight, stopping Russian veteran Ravil Mukhamadiyarov by TKO in the fifth round of their bout at the Monte Kristo Estates in Malta. After winning his first five fights, he faced Will Sands at Sydney Olympic Park for the vacant New South Wales State light welterweight title. He knocked the Australian out in the seventh round to win his first belt. He defeated Fijian rival Sebastian Singh by unanimous decision to claim the WBA Asia light welterweight title in Sydney on 2 July 2016. On 26 March 2017 he won the vacant OPBF light welterweight title with a ten-round unanimous decision victory over Roy Tua Manihuruk.

He then moved down to lightweight, and challenged Joebert Delos Reyes for the vacant Australian title in July. He stopped Delos Reyes with a powerful left hook in the second round to add national champion to his résumé. After winning two non-title bouts, he lost the national title to Victorian state champion Gaige Ireland on Saint Patrick's Day in Sydney. Twelve months later Laamouz faced Italian two-time Olympian Vittorio Parrinello for the vacant WBC Mediterranean super featherweight title in Paola, Malta, beating him by unanimous decision to claim the belt and become Malta's first-ever WBC champion. He was originally scheduled to face the lesser-known Benoit Manno, but he was replaced by Parrinello by the WBC after he failed to make weight.

== Professional boxing record ==
18 fights	17 wins	1 loss
By knockout	7	0
By decision	9	1
By disqualification	1	0

No.	Result	Record	Opponent	Type	Round, time	Date	Location	Notes
18	Win	17–1	(Italy) Mario Alfano	UD	12	4 Dec 2020	Palaboxe Aurelio Santoro, Rome, Italy	Won vacant European Union super featherweight title
17	Win	16–1	(Bulgaria) Slaveya Stefanov	KO	1 (6), 1:06	2 Oct 2020	Monte Kristo Estates, Luqa, Malta	
16	Win	15–1	(Italy) Vittorio Parrinello	UD	10	23 Mar 2019	Corradino Sports Pavilion, Paola, Malta	Won vacant WBC Mediterranean super featherweight title
15	Win	14–1	(Hungary) David Kanalas	KO	2 (6), 2:32	22 Sep 2018	Corradino Sports Pavilion, Paola, Malta	
14	Win	13–1	(Italy) Fabrizio Trotta	DQ	2 (8), 2:43	19 May 2018	Corradino Sports Pavilion, Paola, Malta	Trotta was disqualified for intentionally spitting out his gumshield on three occasions
13	Loss	12–1	(Australia) Gaige Ireland	MD	10	17 Mar 2018	The Star, Sydney, Australia	Lost Australian lightweight title
12	Win	12–0	(Indonesia) Egy Rozten	KO	4 (6), 1:29	8 Dec 2017	Hellenic Club, Canberra, Australia	
11	Win	11–0	(Italy) Mohamed Khalladi	UD	8	30 Sep 2017	Corradino Sports Pavilion, Paola, Malta	
10	Win	10–0	(Australia) Joebert Delos Reyes	TKO	2 (10), 2:27	8 Jul 2017	Fraternity Club, Wollongong, Australia	Won vacant Australian lightweight title
9	Win	9–0	(Indonesia) Roy Tua Manihuruk	UD	10	26 Mar 2017	Club Punchbowl, Sydney, Australia	Won vacant OPBF light welterweight title
8	Win	8–0	(Bosnia and Herzegovina) Borislav Gligoric	TKO	3 (8), 2:25	5 Aug 2016	Aria Complex, San Ġwann, Malta	Won vacant BBO light welterweight title
7	Win	7–0	(Fiji) Sebastian Singh	UD	10	2 Jul 2016	Club Punchbowl, Sydney, Australia	Won vacant WBA Asia light welterweight title
6	Win	6–0	(Australia) Will Sands	KO	7 (8), 1:28	12 Mar 2016	Olympic Park, Sydney, Australia	Won vacant New South Wales light welterweight title
5	Win	5–0	(Australia) Issaka Issah	SD	6	20 Nov 2015	Club Punchbowl, Sydney, Australia	
4	Win	4–0	(Hungary) Sandor Turbucz	UD	6	30 Oct 2015	Basketball Pavilion, Attard, Malta	
3	Win	3–0	(Estonia) Markko Moisar	UD	6	7 Aug 2015	Malta	
2	Win	2–0	(Russia) Ravil Mukhamadiyarov	TKO	5 (6), 1:37	29 May 2015	Monte Kristo Estates, Luqa, Malta	
1	Win	1–0	(Australia) Gearoid Clancy	SD	4	27 Mar 2015	Club Punchbowl, Sydney, Australia	
