= Boxing at the 2011 Pan American Games – Bantamweight =

Men's bantamweight at the 2011 Pan American Games
- Venue: Expo Guadalajara Arena
- Dates: October 21–28
- Competitors: 10 from 10 nations

Medalists
Gold medal	Lázaro Álvarez	Cuba
Silver medal	Óscar Valdez	Mexico
Bronze medal	Ángel Rodríguez	Venezuela
Bronze medal	Robenílson Vieira	Brazil

The men's bantamweight competition of the boxing events at the 2011 Pan American Games in Guadalajara, Mexico, was held between October 21 and 28 at the Expo Guadalajara Arena. The defending champion was McWilliams Arroyo from Puerto Rico. Bantamweights were limited to those boxers weighing less than or equal to 56 kilograms.

Like all Pan American boxing events, the competition was a straight single-elimination tournament. Both semifinal losers were awarded bronze medals, so no boxers competed again after their first loss. Bouts consisted of four rounds of two minutes each, with one-minute breaks between rounds. Punches scored only if the white area on the front of the glove made full contact with the front of the head or torso of the opponent. Five judges scored each bout; three of the judges had to signal a scoring punch within one second for the punch to score. The winner of the bout was the boxer who scored the most valid punches by the end of the bout.

== Results ==
All times are Central Standard Time (UTC−6).

=== Bracket ===
Round of 16; October 21, 2011; 18:00
Joseph Laviolette (CAN)	8
Alberto Melián (ARG)	20
Robenilson Vieira de Jesus (BRA)	13
Felix Verdejo (PUR)	3

Quarterfinals; October 23, 2011; 14:00
Ángel Rodríguez (VEN)	16
Alberto Melián (ARG)	6
Lázaro Álvarez (CUB)	18
Luis Salazar (DOM)	5
Luiz Porozo (ECU)	8
Óscar Valdez (MEX)	22
Robenilson Vieira de Jesus (BRA)	15
Deivis Julio (COL)	4

Semifinals; October 25, 2011; 19:00
Ángel Rodríguez (VEN)	7
Lázaro Álvarez (CUB)	17
Óscar Valdez (MEX)	21
Robenilson Vieira de Jesus (BRA)	10

Finals; October 28, 2011; 19:00
Lázaro Álvarez (CUB)	19
Óscar Valdez (MEX)	15
