= Bryan Chevalier =

Puerto Rican boxer

Personal information
- Nickname: CHARY
- Nationality: Puertorriqueño
- Born: 16 March 1994 (age 32) Bayamón, Puerto Rico
- Height: 5 ft 11 in (180 cm)
- Weight: Super-bantamweight; Featherweight

Boxing career
- Reach: 68 in (173 cm)
- Stance: Orthodox

Boxing record
- Total fights: 23
- Wins: 20
- Win by KO: 16
- Losses: 2
- Draws: 1

Bryan Chevalier (born 16 March 1994) is a Puerto Rican professional boxer, who has held the WBO-NABO featherweight title since 2021.

== Professional boxing career ==
Chevalier made his professional debut against Jean Carlos Molina on 29 March 2014, and won the fight by a first-round knockout. He amassed a 14–0 record during the next five years, before being scheduled to face Luis Lebron for the interim WBO Latino featherweight title. Chevalier won the fight by unanimous decision. Two of the judges scored the fight 100–90 for him, while the third judge awarded him a 97–93 scorecard. Chevalier made the first defense of his newly acquired regional title against Yeison Vargas on 7 December 2019. He won the fight by a third-round knockout.

Chevalier was booked to face Carlos Zambrano on 4 March 2021, following a 15-month absence from the sport. He won the fight by a third-round knockout. Chevalier first knocked Zambrano down in the first round, with a shot to the back of the head which wasn't spotted by the referee. He knocked Zambrano down twice more in the third round, first with a right straight and then with a body shot, which left Zambrano unable to beat the ten count.

Chevalier faced James Wilkins for the vacant WBO-NABO featherweight title on 9 July 2021. The fight was Chevalier's United States debut, as the bout took place at the Banc of California Stadium in Los Angeles. He justified his role as the betting favorite, winning the bout by unanimous decision, with scores of 97–92, 95–94 and 96–93.

Chevalier faced Carlos Padilla on 6 July 2022, following a near year-long absence from the sport. He won the fight by a second-round technical knockout. Chevalier next faced Cesar Juarez for the vacant WBO Intercontinental super featherweight title on 26 October 2022. He won the fight by a seventh-round technical knockout.

== Professional boxing record ==
23 fights	20 wins	2 losses
By knockout	16	2
By decision	4	0
Draws	1	

No.	Result	Record	Opponent	Type	Round, time	Date	Location	Notes
23	Loss	20–2–1	Andres Cortes	TKO	4 (10)	16 Feb 2024	The Theater at Madison Square Garden, New York City, New York, U.S.	Lost WBO Inter-Continental super featherweight title
22	Win	20–1–1	Ranfis Encarnación	RTD	7 (10), 3:00	12 Jul 2023	Wyndham Rio Mar, Rio Grande, Puerto Rico	Retained WBO Inter-Continental super featherweight title
21	Win	19–1–1	Alberto Mercado	TKO	7 (10), 2:59	22 Apr 2023	Cancha Pepin Cestero, Bayamon, Puerto Rico	
20	Win	18–1–1	Cesar Juarez	TKO	7 (10), 1:55	26 Oct 2022	Coliseo Roberto Clemente, San Juan, Puerto Rico	Won vacant WBO Inter-Continental super featherweight title
19	Win	17–1–1	Carlos Padilla	TKO	2 (8), 1:06	6 Jul 2022	Wyndham Rio Mar, Rio Grande, Puerto Rico	
18	Win	16–1–1	James Wilkins	UD	10	9 Jul 2021	Banc of California Stadium, Los Angeles, California, U.S.	Won vacant WBO-NABO featherweight title
17	Win	15–1–1	Carlos Zambrano	KO	3 (8), 2:21	4 Mar 2021	Municipal Boxing Gym Felix Pagan Pintor, Guaynabo, Puerto Rico	
16	Win	14–1–1	Yeison Vargas	KO	3 (10), 1:05	7 Dec 2019	Coliseo Pedrin Zorrilla, San Juan, Puerto Rico	Retained interim WBO Latino featherweight title
15	Win	13–1–1	Luis Lebron	UD	10	17 Aug 2019	Coliseo Pedrin Zorrilla, San Juan, Puerto Rico	Won interim WBO Latino featherweight title
14	Win	12–1–1	Francisco Rodriguez	UD	6	1 Mar 2019	Cancha Nilmarie Santini, Santurce, Puerto Rico	
13	Win	11–1–1	Eliezer Agosto	KO	6 (6), 2:32	6 Oct 2018	Puerto Rico Convention Center, San Juan, Puerto Rico	
12	Win	10–1–1	Ricardo Rodriguez	TKO	2 (8), 2:59	16 Jun 2018	Coliseo de Puerto Rico José Miguel Agrelot, San Juan, Puerto Rico	
11	Win	9–1–1	Luis E Diaz Torres	UD	6	19 Apr 2018	Coliseo de Puerto Rico José Miguel Agrelot, San Juan, Puerto Rico	
10	Loss	8–1–1	Alcides Santiago	KO	2 (4), 2:59	17 Jun 2017	Coliseo Roger L. Mendoza, Caguas, Puerto Rico	
9	Win	8–0–1	Harold Reyes	TKO	5 (6), 2:53	11 Feb 2017	Coliseo Roger L. Mendoza, Caguas, Puerto Rico	
8	Win	7–0–1	Eduardo Melendez	TKO	3 (6), 2:41	10 Sep 2016	Auditorio Municipal, Comerio, Puerto Rico	
7	Win	6–0–1	Luis Miguel Ortiz	KO	3 (6), 0:50	5 Jun 2016	Coliseo Cosme Beitia Salamo, Catano, Puerto Rico	
6	Draw	5–0–1	Harold Reyes	MD	4	14 Nov 2015	Auditorio Municipal, Comerio, Puerto Rico	
5	Win	5–0	Angel Lopez	TKO	4 (4), 2:08	13 Jun 2015	Coliseo Ismael Delgado, Aguada, Puerto Rico	
4	Win	4–0	Joseph Santos	TKO	3 (4), 1:01	14 Mar 2015	Coliseo Roger L. Mendoza, Caguas, Puerto Rico	
3	Win	3–0	Antonio Vera	TKO	1 (4), 1:23	1 Nov 2014	Coliseo Héctor Solá Bezares, Caguas, Puerto Rico	
2	Win	2–0	Jason Agosto	TKO	1 (4), 1:23	11 Jul 2014	Emilio E. Huyke Coliseum, Humacao, Puerto Rico	
1	Win	1–0	Jean Carlos Molina	KO	1 (4), 1:03	29 Mar 2014	Coliseo Cosme Beitia Salamo, Catano, Puerto Rico	
