= Boxing at the 2015 Pan American Games – Men's lightweight =

Men's lightweight at the 2015 Pan American Games
- Venue: Oshawa Sports Centre
- Dates: July 19–25
- Competitors: 10 from 10 nations

Medalists
Gold medal	Lázaro Álvarez	Cuba
Silver medal	Lindolfo Delgado	Mexico
Bronze medal	Kevin Luna	Guatemala
Bronze medal	José Rosario	Puerto Rico

The men's lightweight competition of the boxing events at the 2015 Pan American Games in Toronto, Ontario, Canada, was held between the 19 and 25 of July at the Oshawa Sports Centre. The defending champion is Yasniel Toledo of Cuba. Lightweights is limited to those boxers weighing less than or equal to 60 kilograms.

Like all Pan American boxing events, the competition is a straight single-elimination tournament. Both semifinal losers are awarded bronze medals, so no boxers compete again after their first loss. Bouts consist of a 3 rounds "10-point must" scoring system used in the pro game, where the winner of each round must be awarded 10 points and the loser a lesser amount, and the elimination of the padded headgear. Five judges scored each bout. The winner will be the boxer who scored the most at the end of the match.

== Qualification ==
A total of ten boxers qualified to compete.

== Results ==
=== Bracket ===
Preliminaries; July 19, 2015
Elvis Rodriguez (DOM)	3
Luis Cabrera Machado (VEN)	0
Lindolfo Delgado (MEX)	3
Faider Hernández (COL)	0

Quarterfinals; July 21, 2015
Lázaro Álvarez (CUB)	3
Elvis Rodriguez (DOM)	0
Kevin Luna (GUA)	2
Ronan Sánchez (ARG)	1
José Rosario (PUR)	WO
Merin Zalazar (HON)
Lindolfo Delgado (MEX)	3
Carlos Balderas (USA)	0

Semifinals; July 23, 2015
Lázaro Álvarez (CUB)	3
Kevin Luna (GUA)	0
José Rosario (PUR)	0
Lindolfo Delgado (MEX)	3

Finals; July 25, 2015
Lázaro Álvarez (CUB)	3
Lindolfo Delgado (MEX)	0
