= Boxing at the 2018 South American Games =

- Venue: Coliseo Suramericano
- Dates: 1–6 June
- Nations: 12

There were thirteen boxing events at the 2018 South American Games in Cochabamba, Bolivia. Ten for men and three for women. The events were held between June 1 and 6 at the Coliseo Suramericano.

== Medal summary ==
=== Medal table ===
* Host nation (Bolivia)

Rank	Nation	Gold	Silver	Bronze	Total
1	Colombia (COL)	6	4	0	10
2	Venezuela (VEN)	3	3	4	10
3	Brazil (BRA)	2	1	3	6
4	Peru (PER)	1	0	4	5
5	Panama (PAN)	1	0	0	1
6	Ecuador (ECU)	0	2	6	8
7	Argentina (ARG)	0	2	1	3
8	Bolivia (BOL)*	0	1	4	5
9	Chile (CHI)	0	0	2	2
9	Guyana (GUY)	0	0	2	2
Totals (10 entries)		13	13	26	52

=== Men's events ===
Event	Gold	Silver	Bronze
Light flyweight (49kg)	Yuberjen Martínez; Colombia	Leandro Blanc; Argentina	Brian Fernández; Bolivia
Light flyweight (49kg)	Yuberjen Martínez; Colombia	Leandro Blanc; Argentina	Miguel Ramos; Venezuela
Flyweight (52kg)	Rogger Rivera; Peru	Ceiber Ávila; Colombia	Ramón Quiroga; Argentina
Flyweight (52kg)	Rogger Rivera; Peru	Ceiber Ávila; Colombia	Carlos Mujica; Venezuela
Bantamweight (56kg)	Yoel Finol; Venezuela	Carlos Alanis; Argentina	Jean Caicedo; Ecuador
Bantamweight (56kg)	Yoel Finol; Venezuela	Carlos Alanis; Argentina	Keevin Allicock; Guyana
Lightweight (60kg)	Wanderson de Oliveira; Brazil	Luis Angel Cabrera; Venezuela	David Padilla; Ecuador
Lightweight (60kg)	Wanderson de Oliveira; Brazil	Luis Angel Cabrera; Venezuela	Leodan Pezo; Peru
Light welterweight (64kg)	John Lennon Gutiérrez; Colombia	Miguel Ferrín; Ecuador	Colin Lewis; Guyana
Light welterweight (64kg)	John Lennon Gutiérrez; Colombia	Miguel Ferrín; Ecuador	Ricardo Tamay; Peru
Welterweight (69kg)	Gabriel Maestre; Venezuela	Luiz Rodrigues da Silva; Brazil	Jose Gabriel Rodríguez; Ecuador
Welterweight (69kg)	Gabriel Maestre; Venezuela	Luiz Rodrigues da Silva; Brazil	Eduardo Zuleta; Chile
Middleweight (75kg)	Jorge Vivas; Colombia	Diego Pereira; Venezuela	Hebert Souza; Brazil
Middleweight (75kg)	Jorge Vivas; Colombia	Diego Pereira; Venezuela	Bryan Angulo; Ecuador
Light heavyweight (81kg)	Nalek Korbaj; Venezuela	Diego Motoa; Colombia	Cleverton Melo; Brazil
Light heavyweight (81kg)	Nalek Korbaj; Venezuela	Diego Motoa; Colombia	Carlos Peralta; Bolivia
Heavyweight (91kg)	Deivi Julio; Colombia	Julio Castillo; Ecuador	Rodrigo Carvajal; Bolivia
Heavyweight (91kg)	Deivi Julio; Colombia	Julio Castillo; Ecuador	Juan Diaz; Venezuela
Super heavyweight (+91kg)	Cristian Salcedo; Colombia	Ever Quisbert; Bolivia	Miguel Véliz; Chile
Super heavyweight (+91kg)	Cristian Salcedo; Colombia	Ever Quisbert; Bolivia	Jose Lucar; Peru

=== Results ===
==== Light flyweight ====
Quarterfinals
(Ecuador) Carlos Quipo	2
(Argentina) Leandro Blanc	3
(Bolivia) Brian Fernandez Cáceres	5
(Panama) Martin Perez	0
(Colombia) Yuberjen Martínez	5
(Peru) Isaac Herrera	RSC

Semifinals
(Venezuela) Miguel Ramos	2
(Argentina) Leandro Blanc	3
(Bolivia) Brian Fernandez Cáceres	RSC
(Colombia) Yuberjen Martínez

Final
(Argentina) Leandro Blanc	0
(Colombia) Yuberjen Martínez	5

==== Flyweight ====
Quarterfinals
(Ecuador) Roberto Cuesta	0
(Colombia) Ceiber Ávila	5
(Argentina) Ramón Quiroga	4
(Bolivia) José Luis Mamani	1

Semifinals
(Venezuela) Carlos Mujica	0
(Colombia) Ceiber Ávila	5
(Argentina) Ramón Quiroga	2
(Peru) Rogger Rivera Tomayro	3

Final
(Colombia) Ceiber Ávila	TKO
(Peru) Rogger Rivera Tomayro

==== Bantamweight ====
Round 1
Sergio Jones López (BOL)	3
Jorvi Farroñan Cruzado (PER)	2
Carlos Maria Alanis (ARG)	3
Jhon Wilmer Martínez (COL)	2

Quarterfinals
Jean Carlos Caicedo (ECU)
Sergio Jones López (BOL)
Yoel Finol (VEN)	3
Arilson da Silva Gonçalves (BRA)	2
Lucas Fernandez (URU)	2
Keevin Allicock (GUY)	3
Carlos Maria Alanis (ARG)	5
Leonel Castillo (PAN)	0

Semifinals
Jean Carlos Caicedo (ECU)	0
Yoel Finol (VEN)	5
Keevin Allicock (GUY)	0
Carlos Maria Alanis (ARG)	5

Final
Yoel Finol (VEN)	5
Carlos Maria Alanis (ARG)	0

==== Lightweight ====
Quarterfinals
Luis Angel Cabrera (VEN)	5
Albeiro Paredes Romero (COL)	0
Orlando Martinez Sanchez (PAN)	RSC
Wanderson de Oliveira (BRA)	5

Semifinals
Leodan Pezo (PER)	0
Luis Angel Cabrera (VEN)	5
Wanderson de Oliveira (BRA)	5
David Padilla (ECU)	0

Final
Luis Angel Cabrera (VEN)	0
Wanderson de Oliveira (BRA)	5

==== Light welterweight ====
Quarterfinals
John Lennon Gutiérrez (COL)	4
Ignacio Iribarren (ARG)	1
Colin Lewis (GUY)	3
Jose Palacios Medina (VEN)	2
Jairo Quinteros (URU)	1
Miguel Ferrín (ECU)	4
Erick Aguirre (BOL)	2
Ricardo Tamay (PER)	3

Semifinals
John Lennon Gutiérrez (COL)
Colin Lewis (GUY)	RSC
Miguel Ferrín (ECU)	5
Ricardo Tamay (PER)	0

Final
John Lennon Gutiérrez (COL)	4
Miguel Ferrín (ECU)	1

==== Welterweight ====
Quarterfinals
Alexander Rangel Madariaga (COL)	2
Jose Gabriel Rodriguez (ECU)	3
Francisco Daniel Veron (ARG)	0
Luiz Rodrigues da Silva (BRA)	5
Eduardo Andrés Zuleta Jara (CHI)	5
Ronald Fernando Echalar (BOL)	0

Semifinals
Gabriel Maestre (VEN)	5
Jose Gabriel Rodriguez (ECU)	0
Luiz Rodrigues da Silva (BRA)	5
Eduardo Andrés Zuleta Jara (CHI)	0

Final
Gabriel Maestre (VEN)	5
Luiz Rodrigues da Silva (BRA)	0

==== Middleweight ====
Quarterfinals
Leandro Almiron (ARG)	0
Hebert Conceição (BRA)	5
Jorge Vivas (COL)	5
Omar Ibañez Murguía (PER)	0
Bryan Alejandro Angulo (ECU)
Carlos Hernandez (PAN)	RSC
Joseph Cherkashyn (CHI)	0
Diego Andres Mejia (VEN)	5

Semifinals
Hebert Conceição (BRA)	1
Jorge Vivas (COL)	4
Bryan Alejandro Angulo (ECU)	0
Diego Andres Mejia (VEN)	5

Final
Jorge Vivas (COL)	5
Diego Andres Mejia (VEN)	0

==== Light heavyweight ====
Quarterfinals
Diego Alejandro Motoa Carabali (COL)	3
Carlos Mina (ECU)	0

Semifinals
Carlos Enrique Ramos (BOL)	0
Diego Alejandro Motoa Carabali (COL)	5
Nalek Korbaj (VEN)	5
Cleverton Lucas Galindo De Melo (BRA)	0

Final
Diego Alejandro Motoa Carabali (COL)	0
Nalek Korbaj (VEN)	5

==== Heavyweight ====
Quarterfinals
Deivi Julio (COL)	4
Abner Teixeira (BRA)	1

Semifinals
Rodrigo Felipe Carvajal (BOL)	RSC
Deivi Julio (COL)
Julio Castillo (ECU)	5
Juan Diaz (VEN)	0

Final
Deivi Julio (COL)	4
Julio Castillo (ECU)	1

==== Super Heavyweight ====
Quarterfinals
Cristian Camilo Salcedo Codazzi (COL)	5
Luis Calderon (ARG)	0

Semifinals
Miguel Ángel Véliz Correa (CHI)	0
Cristian Camilo Salcedo Codazzi (COL)	5
Jose Maria Lucar Jaime (PER)	1
Ever Augusto Quisbert Callisaya (BOL)	4

Final
Cristian Camilo Salcedo Codazzi (COL)	5
Ever Augusto Quisbert Callisaya (BOL)	0

=== Women's events ===
Event	Gold	Silver	Bronze
Flyweight (51kg)	Ingrit Valencia; Colombia	Tayonys Cedeño; Venezuela	Lucy Valdivia; Peru
Flyweight (51kg)	Ingrit Valencia; Colombia	Tayonys Cedeño; Venezuela	Graziele Sousa; Brazil
Lightweight (60kg)	Beatriz Ferreira; Brazil	Yeni Arias; Colombia	María Palacios; Ecuador
Lightweight (60kg)	Beatriz Ferreira; Brazil	Yeni Arias; Colombia	María Duran; Bolivia
Middleweight (75kg)	Atheyna Bylon; Panama	Jessica Caicedo; Colombia	Érika Pachito; Ecuador
Middleweight (75kg)	Atheyna Bylon; Panama	Jessica Caicedo; Colombia	Francelis Carmona; Venezuela

==== Flyweight ====
Quarterfinals
Cristina Isabel Porozo Mina (ECU)	1
Lucy Rosario Valdivia Bravo (PER)	4
Graziele Jesus Sousa (BRA)	5
Clara Lescurat (ARG)	0
Tayonys Anaonis Cedeño Rojas (VEN)	5
Nadia Joeunifer Barriga Villarroel (BOL)	0

Semifinals
Ingrit Valencia (COL)	5
Lucy Rosario Valdivia Bravo (PER)	0
Graziele Jesus Sousa (BRA)	0
Tayonys Anaonis Cedeño Rojas (VEN)	5

Final
Ingrit Valencia (COL)	5
Tayonys Anaonis Cedeño Rojas (VEN)	0

==== Lightweight ====
Round 1
María José Palacios (ECU)	5
Elisa Williams Stiverson (PAN)	0

Quarterfinals
Yhamila Dahiana Cabrera Perez (URU)	0
María José Palacios (ECU)	5
Beatriz Ferreira (BRA)	5
Dayana Erika Iohanna Sanchez (ARG)	0
Omailyn Alcalá (VEN)	0
Yeni Arias (COL)	5
Minerva Magali Montiel Mieres (PAR)	1
Maria Teresa Duran (BOL)	4

Semifinals
María José Palacios (ECU)	RSC
Beatriz Ferreira (BRA)
Yeni Arias (COL)	5
Maria Teresa Duran (BOL)	0

Final
Beatriz Ferreira (BRA)	5
Yeni Arias (COL)	0

==== Middleweight ====
Quarterfinals
Evelyn Andrea Tolentino Lozano (PER)	RSC
Erika Stefania Pachito Jurado (ECU)	5
Lucia Noelia Pérez (ARG)	0
Jessica Sinisterra (COL)	5

Semifinals
Atheyna Bylon (PAN)	5
Erika Stefania Pachito Jurado (ECU)	0
Jessica Sinisterra (COL)	5
Francelis Dilmar Carmona Paez (VEN)	0

Final
Atheyna Bylon (PAN)	4
Jessica Sinisterra (COL)	1
