= Andres Cortes =

American boxer (born 1997)

Personal information
- Nickname: Savage
- Born: January 23, 1997 (age 29) North Las Vegas, Nevada, United States
- Height: 1.70 m (5 ft 7 in)
- Weight: Lightweight; Super featherweight

Boxing career
- Reach: 165 cm (65 in)
- Stance: Orthodox

Boxing record
- Total fights: 26
- Wins: 26
- Win by KO: 13

Andres Cortes (born January 23, 1997) is an American professional boxer who fights in the super featherweight division.

== Professional career ==
=== Cortes vs. Fassinou ===
On February 17, 2018, Cortes fought 28–8–3 Beninese veteran Fatiou Fassinou on the undercard of Danny García vs. Brandon Ríos event at Mandalay Bay Events Center, Cortes prevailed and won all rounds in all judges' scorecards.

=== Cortes vs. Servania ===
On August 14, 2021, Cortes was scheduled against previous world title-challenger Genesis Servania who came off from an 18 months lay-off in an 8-rounder bout on the undercard of the trilogy match between Joshua Franco and Andrew Moloney in Hard Rock Hotel & Casino of Tulsa, Oklahoma, Cortes scored a shocking first-round knockout victory within 3 minutes.

=== Cortes vs. Bernaldez ===
On November 5, 2021, Cortes fought Filipino regional-challenger Mark Bernaldez in an 8-rounder match in Virgin Hotels Las Vegas. On the third round of the bout, Cortes hit Bernaldez with heavy right hands prompting the referee to halt the bout.

=== Cortes vs. del Bosque ===
On April 22, 2022, Cortes was announced to be sub-lining alongside fellow contenders against Mexican Alexis del Bosque the Shakur Stevenson vs. Óscar Valdez unification match in the prominent MGM Grand Garden Arena, Paradise, Nevada on April 30, 2022. Cortes stopped del Bosque in the sixth round after a three-punch combination.

=== Cortes vs. Melendez ===
On January 30, 2023, after several amusing victories, Cortes was matched-up against previous top prospect Luis Melendez for Cortes' first ever 10-rounds bout, scheduled in the prelims of the Emanuel Navarrete vs. Liam Wilson card on February 3, 2023 in Glendale, Arizona, Cortes beat Melendez decisively via unanimous decision.

=== Cortes vs. Chevalier ===
After winning the WBC-USNBC Silver against Xavier Martinez, Cortes challenged Bryan Chevalier for the WBO Inter-Continental super featherweight crown, after bold statements from Cortes, he kept his words true and forced halt the contest in the fourth round to dethrone the Puerto Rican contender.

=== Cortes vs. Nova ===
On June 21, 2024, Cortes looks to make his most impressive victory yet as he faces tough world-challenger Puerto Rican Abraham Nova for the vacant WBO-NABO super featherweight titles over 10 rounds, on the day of the weigh-in, Cortes failed to make weight, therefore, the WBO-NABO belt was only for Nova. Cortes beat Nova via unanimous decision with the scores of 97–93 twice and 96–94, despite what the scorecards presented, the decision was deemed controversial amongst viewers.

=== Cortes vs. Jimenez ===
Cortes faced Salvador Jimenez in a 10-round junior lightweight bout on May 10, 2025 at Pechanga Arena in San Diego, California. He won by unanimous decision.

=== Cortes vs. García ===
On April 5, 2026, Cortes defeated Eridson García via unanimous decision at the Meta Apex in Enterprise, Nevada.

== Professional boxing record ==
26 fights	26 wins	0 losses
By knockout	13	0
By decision	13	0

No.	Result	Record	Opponent	Type	Round, time	Date	Location	Notes
26	Win	26–0	Mark Magsayo	UD	10	Sep 12, 2026	T-Mobile Arena, Paradise, Nevada, U.S.	
25	Win	25–0	Eridson García	UD	10	Apr 5, 2026	Meta Apex, Enterprise, Nevada, U.S.	
24	Win	24–0	Derlyn Hernández-Gerarldo	KO	4 (10), 0:40	Oct 18, 2025	Thunder Studios, Long Beach, California, U.S.	
23	Win	23–0	Salvador Jimenez	UD	10	May 10, 2025	Pechanga Arena, San Diego, California, U.S.	
22	Win	22–0	Abraham Nova	UD	10	Jun 21, 2024	Fontainebleau Las Vegas, Winchester, Nevada, U.S.	Vacant WBO-NABO super featherweight title only at stake for Nova as Cortes misses weight
21	Win	21–0	Bryan Chevalier	TKO	4 (10), 2:17	Feb 16, 2024	Madison Square Garden Theater, Manhattan, New York, U.S.	Won WBO Inter-Continental super featherweight title
20	Win	20–0	Xavier Martinez	RTD	7 (10), 3:00	Jul 28, 2023	Palms Casino Resort, Paradise, Nevada, U.S.	Won vacant WBC-USNBC Silver super featherweight title
19	Win	19–0	Luis Melendez	UD	10	Feb 3, 2023	Desert Diamond Arena, Glendale, Arizona, U.S.	
18	Win	18–0	Abraham Montoya	UD	8	Aug 13, 2022	Resorts World Las Vegas, Winchester, Nevada, U.S.	
17	Win	17–0	Alexis del Bosque	KO	6 (8), 0:43	Apr 30, 2022	MGM Grand Garden Arena, Paradise, Nevada, U.S.	
16	Win	16–0	Mark Bernaldez	TKO	3 (8), 2:12	Nov 5, 2011	Virgin Hotels Las Vegas, Paradise, Nevada, U.S.	
15	Win	15–0	Genesis Servania	KO	1 (8), 3:00	Aug 14, 2021	Hard Rock Hotel & Casino, Tulsa, Oklahoma, U.S.	
14	Win	14–0	Eduardo Garza	UD	8	May 22, 2021	Virgin Hotels Las Vegas, Paradise, Nevada, U.S.	
13	Win	13–0	Alejandro Salinas	UD	8	Jul 7, 2020	The Bubble, Paradise, Nevada, U.S.	
12	Win	12–0	Sergio López García	KO	3 (8), 2:53	Jun 28, 2019	Sam's Town Hotel & Gambling Hall, Boulder City, Nevada, U.S.	
11	Win	11–0	Jahmal Dyer	UD	8	Apr 5, 2019	Sam's Town Hotel & Gambling Hall, Boulder City, Nevada, U.S.	
10	Win	10–0	Éder Amaro Fajardo	RTD	3 (8), 3:00	Jan 17, 2019	MGM Grand Garden Arena, Paradise, Nevada, U.S.	
9	Win	9–0	Omar Castillo	TKO	3 (6), 1:16	Oct 27, 2018	Sam's Town Hotel & Gambling Hall, Boulder City, Nevada, U.S.	
8	Win	8–0	Jarret Jeter	UD	6	Aug 3, 2018	Sam's Town Hall & Gambling Hall, Boulder City, Nevada, U.S.	
7	Win	7–0	Fatiou Fassinou	UD	6	Feb 17, 2018	Mandalay Bay Events Center, Paradise, Nevada, U.S.	
6	Win	6–0	Thomas Herrera	TKO	4 (6), 2:05	Oct 21, 2017	Sam's Town Hotel & Gambling Hall, Boulder City, Nevada, U.S.	
5	Win	5–0	Jesus Arevalo	TKO	4 (4), 2:07	Jun 20, 2017	Sam's Town Hotel & Gambling Hall, Boulder City, Nevada, U.S.	
4	Win	4–0	Miguel Espinoza	UD	4	Dec 2, 2016	Sam's Town Hotel & Gambling Hall, Boulder City, Nevada, U.S.	
3	Win	3–0	Ángel Adrián Zendejas Rivera	UD	4	May 27, 2016	Grand Hotel, Tijuana, Mexico	
2	Win	2–0	Cristian Félix Pérez	KO	1 (4), 1:11	Apr 30, 2016	Billar El Perro Salado, Tijuana, Mexico	
1	Win	1–0	Darwin Hernández	KO	1 (4), 2:01	Feb 4, 2016	Rancho Grande Bar, Tijuana, Mexico	

== Titles in boxing ==
=== Regional/International titles ===
- WBO Inter-Continental super featherweight champion (130 lbs)

=== Silver titles ===
- WBC-USNBC Silver super featherweight champion (130lbs)
