= Boxing at the 2010 South American Games – Men's 57kg =

The Men's 57 kg event at the 2010 South American Games had its quarterfinals held on March 22, the semifinals on March 24 and the final on March 27.

== Medalists ==
Gold	Silver	Bronze
Angel Rodriguez; Venezuela	Deivis Julio Bassa; Colombia	Luis Porozo Mina; Ecuador; Ignacio Perrin; Argentina

== Results ==
Quarterfinals
Angel Rodriguez (VEN)	12
Jackmer Majipo Perez (PER)	1
Luis Porozo Mina (ECU)	23
Wilberth Choque Cardozo (BOL)	4
Barnie Arguelles (PAN)	4
Deivis Julio Bassa (COL)	27
Jose Brito (BRA)	2
Ignacio Perrin (ARG)	11

Semifinals
Angel Rodriguez (VEN)	12
Luis Porozo Mina (ECU)	0
Deivis Julio Bassa (COL)	RSCI
Ignacio Perrin (ARG)

Final
Angel Rodriguez (VEN)	3
Deivis Julio Bassa (COL)	0
