= Lázaro Álvarez =

Cuban boxer (born 1991)

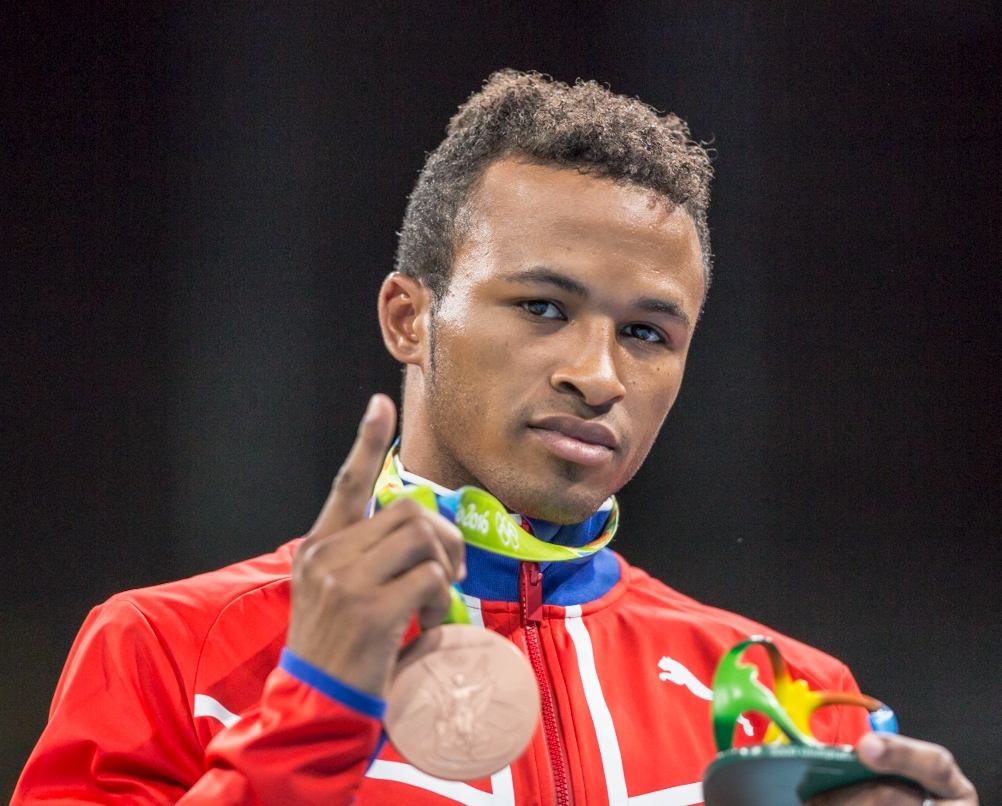
- Álvarez at the 2016 Summer Olympics

Personal information
- Born: 28 January 1991 (age 35) Pinar del Río, Cuba
- Height: 5 ft 9 in (175 cm)
- Weight: 60 kg (132 lb)

Boxing career
- Weight class: Lightweight; Light welterweight

Boxing record
- Total fights: 6
- Wins: 6
- Win by KO: 3
- Losses: 0
- Draws: 0
- No contests: 0
Medal record
Men's amateur boxing
Representing Cuba
Event	1st	2nd	3rd
Olympic Games	0	0	3
World Championships	3	2	0
Pan American Games	3	0	0
Central American & Caribbean Games	2	0	0
Total	8	2	3
Olympic Games
Bronze medal – third place	2012 London	Bantamweight
Bronze medal – third place	2016 Rio de Janeiro	Lightweight
Bronze medal – third place	2020 Tokyo	Featherweight
World Amateur Championships
Gold medal – first place	2011 Baku	Bantamweight
Gold medal – first place	2013 Almaty	Lightweight
Gold medal – first place	2015 Doha	Lightweight
Silver medal – second place	2017 Hamburg	Lightweight
Silver medal – second place	2019 Yekaterinburg	Featherweight
Pan American Games
Gold medal – first place	2011 Guadalajara	Bantamweight
Gold medal – first place	2015 Toronto	Lightweight
Gold medal – first place	2019 Lima	Lightweight
Pan American Championship
Gold medal – first place	2017 Tegucigalpa	Lightweight
Central American and Caribbean Games
Gold medal – first place	2014 Veracruz	Lightweight
Gold medal – first place	2018 Barranquilla	Lightweight

Lázaro Jorge Álvarez Estrada (born 28 January 1991) is a Cuban professional and amateur boxer. As an amateur, Álvarez won the world title in 2011, 2013 and 2015. He also won gold medals at the 2011, 2015, and 2019 Pan American Games and bronze medals at the 2012, 2016 and 2020 Olympics. He is a southpaw. His amateur record is currently 213–37, with 15 knockouts.

== Amateur career ==
In the final of 2011 World Championships, he beat England's Luke Campbell after 3 rounds with 14–10 final score.

Later that year he also won the 2011 Pan American title against Mexican Oscar Valdez.

At the 2012 Summer Olympics, competing at bantamweight, he beat American Joseph Diaz and Robenílson Vieira of Brazil but lost to Irishman John Joe Nevin 14–19 in the semifinal and won bronze. He lost in the final of the Cuban Championships to Robeisy Ramirez.

After 2012, he moved up to lightweight.

Álvarez won the lightweight title at the 2013 AIBA World Championships, beating Joseph Cordina, Fazliddin Gaibnazarov, Saylom Ardee, Berik Abdrakhmanov and, in the final, Robson Donato Conceicao.

In 2014, he won the Cuban title.

At the 2015 Pan American Games, he won gold, beating Elvis Severino Rodriguez, Kevin Luna and Lindolfo Delgado along the way. That year, he also won the World Series of Boxing final, against Zakir Safiullin.

He won the bronze medal at the men's lightweight event at the 2016 Summer Olympics, losing to Conceicao in the semifinal.

Later in 2016 he was suspended from the Cuban national team, suspended from competition for six months, and removed from the list of the best athletes of the year after he died his hair.

At the 2019 World Championships, he fought at featherweight, beating Peter McGrail, before losing to Mirazizbek Mirzakhalilov in the final.

== Professional career ==
=== Early career ===
Álvarez made his professional debut on 20 May 2022, in a bout against Francisco Mercado. He took a clear unanimous decision after six rounds. In the time since Álvarez has had four fights in Mexico and Bolivia in between amateur events.

== Professional boxing record ==
6 fights	6 wins	0 losses
By knockout	3	0
By decision	3	0

No.	Result	Record	Opponent	Type	Round, time	Date	Location	Notes
6	Win	6–0	Edgar Espinosa Vargas	KO	1 (10), 1:04	18 Aug 2023	Cancun, Mexico	
5	Win	5–0	Willmank Canonico Brito	UD	10	10 Mar 2023	Velaria de la Feria, León, Mexico	
4	Win	4–0	Sergio Puente	RTD	4 (8), 3:00	27 Jan 2023	Showcenter Monterrey, San Pedro, Mexico	
3	Win	3–0	Brandom Obledo Cabrera	TKO	5 (8), 0:51	7 Oct 2022	Centro de Usos Multiples, Hermosillo, Mexico	
2	Win	2–0	Alexis Nahuel Torres	UD	8	22 Jul 2022	Pabellon Santa Cruz, Santa Cruz de la Sierra, Bolivia	
1	Win	1–0	Francisco Mercado	UD	6	20 May 2022	Palenque de la FNSM, Aguascalientes, Mexico	
