= Juan Carlos Burgos =

Mexican boxer (born 1987)

Personal information
- Nickname: Miniburgos
- Born: Juan Carlos Burgos Castillo; December 26, 1987 (age 38) Tijuana, Baja California, Mexico
- Height: 5 ft 9 1/2 in (177 cm)
- Weight: Featherweight; Super featherweight

Boxing career
- Reach: 68 1/2 in (174 cm)
- Stance: Orthodox

Boxing record
- Total fights: 46
- Wins: 35
- Win by KO: 21
- Losses: 8
- Draws: 3

Juan Carlos Burgos Castillo (born December 26, 1987) is a Mexican professional boxer. He's nicknamed Miniburgos after his uncle, who is a former world champion Víctor Burgos. Juan Carlos was the top ranked Featherweight by the WBC in 2010.

== Professional career ==
Burgos scored a twelfth round stoppage over Juan Carlos Martinez in a Featherweight bout in Laredo, Texas. With his win over Martinez on ESPN Burgos is now ranked #2 by the WBC.

=== WBC Featherweight Championship ===
He fought Ricardo Castillo on May 28, 2010, scoring a tenth-round TKO over Castillo.

Following the Elimination Bout, Burgos lost to the former WBC Bantamweight Champion Hozumi Hasegawa, for the vacant WBC Featherweight Title at the Nippon Gaishi Hall in Japan on November 26, 2010.

=== Martinez vs. Burgos controversy ===
WBO lightweight title holder Roman Martínez and Burgos fought to a draw on January 19, 2013, with most people believing that Burgos had won an easy unanimous decision. However; the fight turned out to be a split draw. One judge scored it 116-112 (8 rounds to 4 for Martínez), 114-114, and one judge scoring it for Burgos. According to the official punch stats, Burgos outlanded Martínez by 93 overall punches and 70 power punches.

== Professional boxing record ==
46 fights	35 wins	8 losses
By knockout	21	0
By decision	14	8
Draws	3	

No.	Result	Record	Opponent	Type	Round, time	Date	Location	Notes
46	Loss	35–8–3	Andy Cruz	UD	10	July 15, 2023	Masonic Temple, Detroit, Michigan, U.S.	
45	Loss	35–7–3	Keyshawn Davis	UD	8	December 10, 2022	Madison Square Garden, New York City, New York, U.S.	
44	Win	35–6–3	Jonathan Chanona Aguilar	UD	8	September 30, 2022	Grand Hotel, Tijuana, Baja California, Mexico	
43	Draw	34–6–3	Angel Fierro	MD	10	March 5, 2022	Pechanga Arena, San Diego, California, U.S.	
42	Loss	34–6–2	Starling Castillo	UD	10	September 5, 2021	Minneapolis Armory, Minneapolis, Minnesota, U.S.	
41	Loss	34–5–2	Xavier Martinez	UD	10	May 15, 2021	Dignity Health Sports Park, Carson, California, U.S.	
40	Win	34–4–2	Juan Ramon Bernal	UD	8	March 6, 2020	Salon Diamante del Hotel Quartz, Tijuana, Baja California, Mexico	
39	Loss	33–4–2	Hector Tanajara Jr.	UD	10	January 11, 2020	Alamodome, San Antonio, Texas, U.S.	
38	Loss	33–3–2	Devin Haney	UD	10	September 28, 2018	Pechanga Resort & Casino, Temecula, California, U.S.	
37	Win	33–2–2	Hector Garcia Montes	UD	8	August 19, 2017	Plaza de Toros Caliente, Tijuana, Baja California, Mexico	
36	Win	32–2–2	Jorge Sillas Amor	UD	6	March 4, 2017	Salon Sindicato Alba Roja, Tijuana, Baja California, Mexico	
35	Win	31–2–2	Hector Nava Lopez	TKO	3 (6)	December 10, 2016	AS Boxing Arena, Tijuana, Baja California, Mexico	
34	Loss	30–2–2	Mikey Garcia	UD	12	January 25, 2014	Madison Square Garden Theater, New York City, New York, U.S.	For WBO super featherweight title
33	Draw	30–1–2	Yakubu Amidu	SD	12	July 26, 2013	Thunder Valley Casino Resort, Lincoln, California, U.S.	
32	Draw	30–1–1	Román Martínez	SD	12	January 19, 2013	Madison Square Garden Theater, New York City, New York, U.S.	For WBO super featherweight title
31	Win	30–1	César Vázquez	TKO	3 (10)	July 20, 2012	Edgewater Hotel and Casino, Laughlin, Nevada, U.S.	
30	Win	29–1	Cristóbal Cruz	UD	10	February 24, 2012	Dover Downs Hotel & Casino, Dover, Delaware, U.S.	
29	Win	28–1	Luis Cruz	MD	10	November 12, 2011	MGM Grand Garden Arena, Paradise, Nevada, U.S.	
28	Win	27–1	Gilberto Sanchez Leon	UD	10	July 22, 2011	Doubletree Hotel, Ontario, California, U.S.	
27	Win	26–1	Frankie Archuleta	TKO	2 (10)	February 25, 2011	Million Dollar Elm Casino, Tulsa, Oklahoma, U.S.	
26	Loss	25–1	Hozumi Hasegawa	UD	12	November 26, 2010	Nihon Gaishi Hall, Nagoya, Aichi, Japan	For vacant WBC featherweight title
25	Win	25–0	Ricardo Castillo	RTD	11 (12)	May 29, 2010	Arena Tecate, Guadalajara, Jalisco, Mexico	
24	Win	24–0	Carlos Martinez	TKO	12 (12)	January 15, 2010	Laredo Civic Center, Laredo, Texas, U.S.	Retained WBC CABOFE featherweight title
23	Win	23–0	Yogli Herrera	TKO	6 (10)	October 9, 2009	Doubletree Hotel, Ontario, California, U.S.	
22	Win	22–0	Vyacheslav Gusev	UD	10	June 12, 2009	Doubletree Hotel, Ontario, California, U.S.	Retained WBC CABOFE featherweight title
21	Win	21–0	Fernando Lizarraga	TKO	2 (10)	February 27, 2009	Doubletree Hotel, Ontario, California, U.S.	Won vacant WBC CABOFE featherweight title
20	Win	20–0	Salvador Perez	MD	8	November 28, 2008	Doubletree Hotel, Ontario, California, U.S.	
19	Win	19–0	Andres Ledesma	UD	8	July 25, 2008	Omega International, Corona, California, U.S.	
18	Win	18–0	Rafael Urias	UD	10	April 14, 2008	Auditorio Municipal, Tijuana, Baja California, Mexico	
17	Win	17–0	Miguel Munguia	RTD	3 (8)	March 15, 2008	Doubletree Hotel, Orange, California, U.S.	
16	Win	16–0	Jose Hernandez Sandoval	UD	10	September 22, 2007	Palenque Hipodromo, Tijuana, Baja California, Mexico	
15	Win	15–0	Adam Carrera	KO	3 (8)	August 24, 2007	Omega International, Corona, California, U.S.	
14	Win	14–0	Moises Zamudio	TKO	6 (8)	May 12, 2007	Palenque Hipodromo, Tijuana, Baja California, Mexico	
13	Win	13–0	Rodolfo Garay	UD	10	October 16, 2006	Auditorio Municipal, Tijuana, Baja California, Mexico	Won WBC Continental Americas featherweight title
12	Win	12–0	Juan Rivera	KO	2 (8)	August 24, 2006	El Foro, Tijuana, Baja California, Mexico	
11	Win	11–0	Manuel Castro	TKO	1 (8)	July 14, 2006	Gimnasio Mariano Matamoros, Tijuana, Baja California, Mexico	
10	Win	10–0	Juan Velasquez	KO	4 (6)	May 26, 2006	Plaza del Sol, Mexicali, Baja California, Mexico	
9	Win	9–0	Saul Lopez	TKO	6 (6)	February 25, 2006	Discoteca Baby Rock, Tijuana, Baja California, Mexico	
8	Win	8–0	Pablo Bojorquez	TKO	3 (8)	December 11, 2005	Discoteca Tangaloo, Tijuana, Baja California, Mexico	
7	Win	7–0	Carlos Valenzuela	TKO	5 (6)	September 9, 2005	Auditorio Municipal, Tijuana, Baja California, Mexico	
6	Win	6–0	Roberto Castro	TKO	2 (6)	August 13, 2005	Palenque Hipodromo, Tijuana, Baja California, Mexico	
5	Win	5–0	Jose Fernandez	UD	6	June 17, 2005	El Foro, Tijuana, Baja California, Mexico	
4	Win	4–0	Ramon Lazcano	TKO	2 (6)	April 29, 2005	El Foro, Tijuana, Baja California, Mexico	
3	Win	3–0	Jose Luis Alvarez	TKO	3 (4)	March 12, 2005	El Foro, Tijuana, Baja California, Mexico	
2	Win	2–0	Andres Macias	TKO	2 (4)	January 7, 2005	El Foro, Tijuana, Baja California, Mexico	
1	Win	1–0	Martin Borquez	KO	1 (4)	December 10, 2004	El Foro, Tijuana, Baja California, Mexico	

== See also ==
- Notable boxing families
