= Elnur Abduraimov =

Uzbekistani boxer (born 1994)

Personal information
- Nickname: Nur
- Nationality: Kazakh
- Born: 10 June 1994 (age 32) Gazalkent, Uzbekistan
- Height: 1.70 m (5 ft 7 in)
- Weight: Lightweight

Boxing career
- Reach: 72 1/2 in (184 cm)
- Stance: Southpaw

Boxing record
- Total fights: 10
- Wins: 10
- Win by KO: 9
Medal record
Men's amateur boxing
Representing Uzbekistan
World Championships
Bronze medal – third place	2015 Doha	Lightweight
Asian Championships
Gold medal – first place	2017 Tashkent	Lightweight
Bronze medal – third place	2021 Dubai	Light welterweight
Bronze medal – third place	2015 Bangkok	Lightweight

Elnur Abduraimov (Kazakh: Елнұр Нұрғалиұлы Абдураимов, born 10 June 1994) is an Uzbek professional boxer. He won a bronze medal at the 2015 AIBA World Boxing Championships as an amateur.

He also won a bronze medal at the 2015 Asian Championships. He went on to win gold at the 2017 Asian Championships.

Abduraimov competed at the 2020 Summer Olympics.

== Professional career ==
On 29 Sep 2018, Abduraimov made his professional debut against American Aaron Jamel Hollis. Abduraimov won the bout after knocking Hollis out with a left hand to the body in the opening round.

== Professional boxing record ==
11 fights	10 wins	1 loss
By knockout	9	1
By decision	1	0

No.	Result	Record	Opponent	Type	Round, time	Date	Location	Notes
10	Win	10–0	Leonel Moreno	KO	1 (10), 1:14	28 Jul 2022	Fantasy Springs Casino, Indio, California, US	
9	Win	9–0	Manuel Correa	TKO	2 (10), 2:43	7 May 2022	T-Mobile Arena, Paradise, Nevada, US	
8	Win	8–0	Jhon Gemino	KO	6 (10), 0:57	17 Dec 2021	Hotel Renaissance, Tashkent, Uzbekistan	
7	Win	7–0	Sherzodjon Abdurazzokov	UD	6	26 Feb 2021	USC Soviet Wings, Moscow, Russia	
6	Win	6–0	Abraham Oliva	TKO	1 (6), 1:18	12 Dec 2020	San Luis Rio Colorado, Mexico	
5	Win	5–0	Issa Nampepeche	TKO	4 (6), 1:36	18 May 2019	RCC Boxing Academy, Ekaterinburg, Russia	
4	Win	4–0	Dmitrii Khasiev	TKO	2 (6), 2:58	23 Mar 2019	RCC Boxing Academy, Ekaterinburg, Russia	
3	Win	3–0	Aelio Mesquita	KO	1 (4), 1:09	10 Nov 2018	RCC Boxing Academy, Ekaterinburg, Russia	
2	Win	2–0	Giovannie Gonzalez	KO	2 (4), 2:38	18 Oct 2018	Fantasy Springs Casino, Indio, California, US	
1	Win	1–0	Aaron Jamel Hollis	KO	1 (4), 1:44	29 Sep 2018	Fantasy Springs Casino, Indio, California, US	
