= Hugo Micallef =

Monégasque boxer (born 1998)

Personal information
- Nickname: Fresh Prince of Monaco
- Born: Hugo Andre Jean-Luc Micallef; March 6, 1998 (age 28) Monte Carlo, Monaco
- Height: 5 ft 11 in (180 cm)
- Weight: Super Lightweight

Boxing career
- Reach: N/A
- Stance: Orthodox

Boxing record
- Total fights: 11
- Wins: 11
- Win by KO: 3
- Losses: 1
- No contests: 0

Hugo Micallef is a Monégasque professional boxer currently signed with Top Rank.

== Amateur career ==
Micallef competed in multiple international tournaments on the amateur stage. One example of this was his participation at the 2019 European Games where he would reach the quarterfinals before losing to Pat McCormack. He would also attempt to qualify for the 2024 Summer Olympics, but he would lose the first qualifying round to Mizan Aykol.

== Professional career ==
Micallef would make his professional debut on 10 September 2021 against Ezequiel Gregores whom he would beat via unanimous fecision. His first fight under Top Rank would come on 16 November 2023, where he would beat Sergio Odabai via retirement in the fourth round.

He challenged IBF European super-lightweight champion Seán McComb at Salle des Étoiles in Monte Carlo on 6 December 2025. Micallef lost by stoppage in the eighth round.

== Professional boxing record ==
12 fights	11 wins	1 loss
By knockout	3	1
By decision	8	0

No.	Result	Record	Opponent	Type	Round, time	Date	Location	Notes
12	Loss	11–1	Seán McComb	TKO	8 (10) 2:35	6 Dec 2025	Salle des Etoiles, Monte Carlo, Monaco	For IBF European super-lightweight title
11	Win	11–0	Marko Dimitrović	TKO	4 (8)	8 Jun 2025	Piazza Santa Croce, Florence, Italy	
10	Win	10–0	Bogdan Drasković	UD	6	11 Jul 2024	Skanderbeg Square, Tirana, Albania	
9	Win	9–0	Sergio Odabai	RTD	4 (6) 3:00	16 Nov 2023	T-Mobile Arena, Paradise, Nevada, U.S.	
8	Win	8–0	Denis Bartos	KO	1 (6) 2:11	23 Sep 2023	Chapiteau de l'Espace Fontvieille, Fontvieille, Monaco	
7	Win	7–0	Michal Bulik	UD	6	24 Jun 2023	Kolbenschmidt Arena, Heilbronn, Germany	
6	Win	6–0	Alessandro Fersula	UD	8	1 Apr 2023	Kraftverkehr Chemnitz, Chemnitz, Germany	
5	Win	5–0	Lesther Lara	UD	6	17 Dec 2022	Parc des Expositions, Nantes, France	
4	Win	4–0	Ilias Kallouch	UD	6	14 Oct 2022	Monza Arena, Monza, Italy	
3	Win	3–0	Mauro Loli	UD	6	16 Jul 2022	Maritim Hotel, Magdeburg, Germany	
2	Win	2–0	Gonzalo Omar Manriquez	UD	6	29 Jan 2022	Hotel Alimara, Barcelona, Spain	
1	Win	1–0	Ezequiel Gregores	UD	4	10 Sep 2021	Stade Roland Garros, Paris, France	
