= Boxing at the 2019 Pan American Games – Men's 60 kg =

Men's Lightweight at the 2019 Pan American Games
- Venue: Miguel Grau Coliseum
- Dates: July 27– August 1, 2019
- Competitors: 7 from 7 nations

Medalists
Gold medal	Lázaro Álvarez; Cuba
Silver medal	Leonel de los Santos; Dominican Republic
Bronze medal	Leodan Pezo; Peru
Bronze medal	Luis Angel Cabrera; Venezuela

The Men's lightweight competition of the boxing events at the 2019 Pan American Games in Lima, Peru, was held between the 27 of July and the 1 of August 2019 at the Miguel Grau Coliseum.

Like all Pan American boxing events, the competition is a straight single-elimination tournament. Both semifinal losers are awarded bronze medals, so no boxers compete again after their first loss. Bouts consist of a 3 rounds "10-point must" scoring system used in the pro game, where the winner of each round must be awarded 10 points and the loser a lesser amount, and the elimination of the padded headgear. Five judges scored each bout. The winner will be the boxer who scored the most at the end of the match.

== Results ==
=== Bracket ===
Quarterfinals; July 27, 2019
Leodan Pezo (PER)	4
Orlando Martínez (PAN)	1
Bruce Carrington (USA)	0
Leonel de los Santos (DOM)	5
Shiloh Defreitas (JAM)	1
Luis Angel Cabrera (VEN)	4

Semifinals; July 30, 2019
Lázaro Álvarez (CUB)	RSC
Leodan Pezo (PER)
Leonel de los Santos (DOM)	WO
Luis Angel Cabrera (VEN)

Final; August 1, 2019
Lázaro Álvarez (CUB)	3
Leonel de los Santos (DOM)	2
