= 2009 World Amateur Boxing Championships – Lightweight =

Boxing competitions

The Lightweight competition was the five-lowest weight featured at the 2009 World Amateur Boxing Championships, and was held at the Mediolanum Forum. Lightweights were limited to a maximum of 60 kilograms in body mass.

== Medalists ==
Gold	Domenico Valentino; Italy
Silver	José Pedraza; Puerto Rico
Bronze	Koba Pkhakadze; Georgia
Bronze	Albert Selimov; Russia

== Seeds ==
1. (Cuba) Idel Torriente (quarterfinals)
2. (Armenia) Hrachik Javakhyan (second round)
3. (Turkmenistan) Serdar Hudayberdiev (quarterfinals)
4. (Turkey) Yakup Kılıç (first round)
5. (Hungary) Miklós Varga (second round)
6. (Italy) Domenico Valentino (champion)
7. (Russia) Albert Selimov (semifinals)
8. (Puerto Rico) José Pedraza (final)

== Draw ==
=== Finals ===
Quarterfinals
Idel Torriente (CUB)	5
Domenico Valentino (ITA)	10
Eugen Burhard (GER)	2
Koba Pkhakadze (GEO)	9
Serdar Hudayberdiev (TKM)	4
José Pedraza (PUR)	13
Albert Selimov (RUS)	17
Éverton Lopes (BRA)	2

Semifinals
Domenico Valentino (ITA)	15
Koba Pkhakadze (GEO)	2
José Pedraza (PUR)	9
Albert Selimov (RUS)	5

Final
Domenico Valentino (ITA)	9
José Pedraza (PUR)	4

=== Top Half ===
==== Section 1 ====
Round 1

Round 2
Idel Torriente (CUB)	11
Gani Zhailauov (KAZ)	7
Aubrey Moore (GUY)	3
Hüsnü Koçabas (NED)	16
Francisco Vargas (MEX)	5
Han Soon Chul (KOR)	12
Suraka Al Waaily (IRQ)	5
Domenico Valentino (ITA)	15

Round 3
Idel Torriente (CUB)	8
Hüsnü Koçabas (NED)	0
Han Soon Chul (KOR)
Domenico Valentino (ITA)	RSC

Quarterfinals
Idel Torriente (CUB)	5
Domenico Valentino (ITA)	10

==== Section 2 ====
Round 1
Ibrahim Kamal (CAN)	3
Eugen Burhard (GER)	11
Jai Bhagwan (IND)	10
Angel Rodríguez (VEN)	4
Eric Donovan (IRL)	13
Bakhodir Karimov (TJK)	4
Gabriel Podasca (ROU)	10
Ismet Zeric (BIH)	6
Koba Pkhakadze (GEO)	17
Aurimas Naudzius (LTU)	10
Hoorshid Tojibaev (TJK)	13
Mahmmoud Eshesish (JOR)	8
Mahdi Ouatine (MAR)	8
Yakup Kılıç (TUR)	5

Round 2
Miklós Varga (HUN)	10
Eugen Burhard (GER)	+10
Jai Bhagwan (IND)	11
Eric Donovan (IRL)	6
Gabriel Podasca (ROU)	2
Koba Pkhakadze (GEO)	16
Hoorshid Tojibaev (TJK)	7
Mahdi Ouatine (MAR)	14

Round 3
Eugen Burhard (GER)	9
Jai Bhagwan (IND)	3
Koba Pkhakadze (GEO)	17
Mahdi Ouatine (MAR)	3

Quarterfinals
Eugen Burhard (GER)	2
Koba Pkhakadze (GEO)	9

=== Bottom Half ===
==== Section 3 ====
Round 1
Serdar Hudayberdiev (TKM)	16
Takashi Sugiura (JPN)	2
Haithem Laamouz (MLT)	1
Hu Qianxun (CHN)	12
Achelle Apie (CMR)
Vazgen Safaryants (BLR)	WO
Issah Samir (GHA)	11
Dmytro Bulenkov (UKR)	17
Valentino Knowles (BAH)	11
Joseph Njogu (KEN)	8
Nabaloum Hassane (BUR)	8
Ljubomir Marjanovic (SRB)	27
Filip Palic (CRO)	5
Zorigtbaataryn Enkhzorig (MGL)	13
Abdlay Anarbay Uulu (KGZ)	4
José Pedraza (PUR)	10

Round 2
Serdar Hudayberdiev (TKM)	10
Hu Qianxun (CHN)	2
Vazgen Safaryants (BLR)	12
Dmytro Bulenkov (UKR)	14
Valentino Knowles (BAH)	6
Ljubomir Marjanovic (SRB)	18
Zorigtbaataryn Enkhzorig (MGL)	3
José Pedraza (PUR)	4

Round 3
Serdar Hudayberdiev (TKM)	RSCI
Dmytro Bulenkov (UKR)
Ljubomir Marjanovic (SRB)	5
José Pedraza (PUR)	6

Quarterfinals
Serdar Hudayberdiev (TKM)	4
José Pedraza (PUR)	13

==== Section 4 ====
Round 1
Albert Selimov (RUS)	25
Mohammad Aziz (AFG)	1
Jonas Moeti (BOT)
Erick Bone (ECU)	RSC
Yasin Abdelhamid (EGY)	1
Michak Zerominski (POL)	7
Saylom Ardee (THA)	12
Duran Caferro (USA)	9
Vilasack Khuandy (LAO)	11
Carlos David Arce (ISV)	0
Thomas Stalker (ENG)	11
Joegin Ladon (PHI)	4
Ruslan Gasimov (AZE)	2
Éverton Lopes (BRA)	10
Simeon Bunarzhizh (BUL)	1
Hrachik Javakhyan (ARM)	11

Round 2
Albert Selimov (RUS)	18
Erick Bone (ECU)	0
Michak Zerominski (POL)	5
Saylom Ardee (THA)	13
Vilasack Khuandy (LAO)	1
Thomas Stalker (ENG)	13
Éverton Lopes (BRA)	10
Hrachik Javakhyan (ARM)	3

Round 3
Albert Selimov (RUS)	14
Saylom Ardee (THA)	8
Thomas Stalker (ENG)	5
Éverton Lopes (BRA)	14

Quarterfinals
Albert Selimov (RUS)	17
Éverton Lopes (BRA)	2

== See also ==
- Boxing at the 2008 Summer Olympics – Lightweight
