= Ryan Garcia vs. Conor Benn =

Boxing competition

- Date: September 12, 2026
- Venue: T-Mobile Arena, Paradise, Nevada, U.S.
- Titles on the line: WBC welterweight title

Tale of the tape
Boxer	Ryan Garcia	Conor Benn
Nickname	King Ry	The Destroyer
Hometown	Victorville, California, U.S.	London, England, U.K.
Pre-fight record	25–2 (1) (20 KOs)	25–1 (14 KOs)
Age	28 years, 1 month	29 years, 11 months
Height	5 ft 8 in (173 cm)	5 ft 8 in (173 cm)
Style	Orthodox	Orthodox
Recognition	WBC welterweight champion The Ring; No. 5 Ranked Welterweight	WBC; No. 1 Ranked Welterweight

Result
- Garcia wins by 2nd-round TKO

Ryan Garcia vs. Conor Benn, billed as USA vs. UK, was a professional boxing match for the WBC welterweight championship between world champion Ryan Garcia and Conor Benn. It took place on September 12, 2026, at T-Mobile Arena in Paradise, Nevada.

The fight was co-promoted by Zuffa Boxing and Golden Boy Promotions, in partnership with The Ring magazine, and broadcast in most countries on Paramount+, with DAZN carrying the event in the United Kingdom and Ireland.

== Background ==
During Mexican American boxer Ryan Garcia's one-year suspension after failing a drug test from his bout against Devin Haney, both Garcia and British boxer Conor Benn attended the 2024 Ring Magazine Awards and during an interview, Benn stated he would fight Garcia when asked about a potential matchup. Garcia then approached Benn, leading to a tense staredown in which Benn shoved Garcia before security intervened.

Following Garcia's victory against Mario Barrios to claim the WBC welterweight title, Benn congratulated Garcia and said, "Keep my belt warm" for a potential match later in the year. Months later, Benn defeated Regis Prograis by UD in the co-main event of Fury vs. Makhmudov. Later that night, Benn called out Garcia for a fight on social media, which Garcia accepted.

On July 15, 2026, Dana White officially announced Ryan Garcia vs. Conor Benn. This was Garcia's first WBC title defense against his mandatory challenger. The fight was promoted by TKO's Zuffa Boxing league, in partnership with Golden Boy Promotions and The Ring magazine.

On September 11, Zuffa Boxing's wrestling sister company WWE and its Mexican subsidiary Lucha Libre AAA Worldwide held Night 1 of Triplemanía 34, which took place at the nearby MGM Grand Garden Arena, as a lead-in to the boxing match. Also as part of Garcia vs. Benn weekend, TKO promoted UFC Fight Night: Silva vs. Delgado, the fourth edition of the UFC's annual "Noche UFC" MMA event celebrating Mexican culture, on September 12 in Glendale, Arizona. Triplemanía 34, UFC Fight Night: Silva vs. Delgado, and Garcia vs. Benn were all held days before Mexican Independence Day, a major time for Mexican combat sports.

== Fight card ==
Weight class		vs.		Method	Round	Time	Notes
Main card (Paramount+)
Welterweight	Ryan Garcia (c)	def.	Conor Benn	TKO	2/12	1:25	^{Note 1}
Cruiserweight	Jai Opetaia (c)	def.	Noel Mikaelian	TKO	9/12	1:30	^{Note 2}
Heavyweight	Da'Mazion Vanhouter	def.	Raphael Akpejiori	KO	1/8	1:58
Lightweight	Andres Cortes	def.	Mark Magsayo	UD	10	3:00
Preliminary card (Paramount+)
Lightweight	Oswaldo Molina	def.	Pablo Rubio	UD	6	3:00
Super Middleweight	Abel Gonzalez	def.	Raul Salomon	UD	8	3:00
Super Welterweight	Vlad Panin	def.	Dakota Linger	TKO	4/6	1:22
Welterweight	Alexis Rocha	def.	José Ramírez	UD	10	3:00
Lightweight	Sean Garcia	def.	Abraham Morales	MD	6	3:00

^Note 1 For WBC welterweight title.
^Note 2 For Zuffa Boxing, The Ring and vacant WBA (Regular) cruiserweight titles.

== Bonus awards ==
The following fighters received $50,000 bonuses.

- Fight of the Night: Abel Gonzalez vs. Raul Salomon
- Performance of the Night: Da'Mazion Vanhouter and Oswaldo Molina
