= Graziele Sousa =

Brazilian amateur boxer

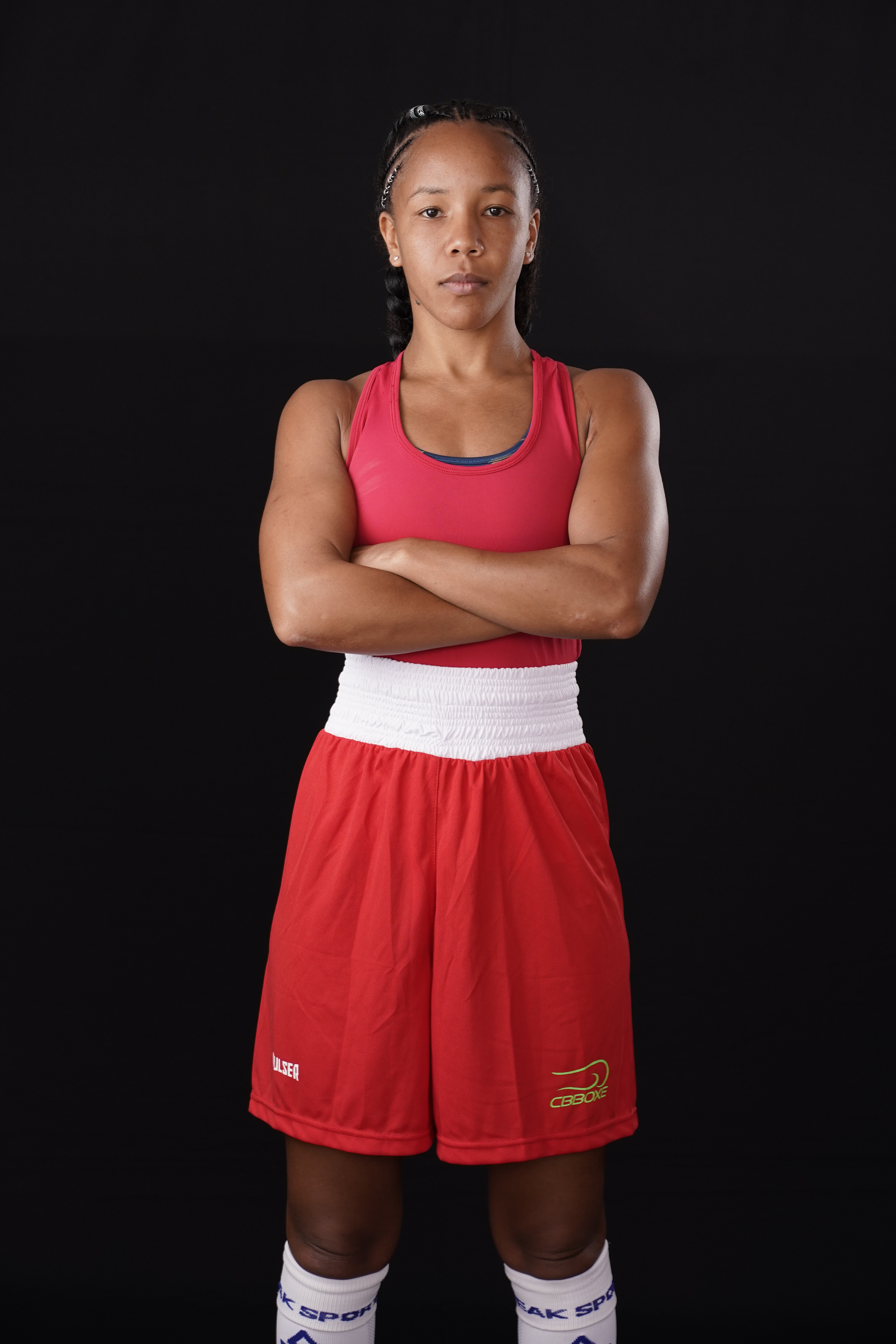

Personal information
- Nationality: Brazilian
- Born: 3 January 1991 (age 35) Mogi das Cruzes, São Paulo
- Height: 162 cm (5 ft 4 in)

Boxing career
- Weight class: Flyweight
Medal record
Women's amateur boxing
Representing Brazil
South American Games
Bronze medal – third place	2018 Cochabamba	Flyweight

Graziele Jesus de Sousa, most known as Graziele Jesus, is a Brazilian amateur boxer. She represented Brazil at the 2020 Summer Olympics in Tokyo.
