= Ben Crocker (boxer) =

Welsh boxer (born 1994)

Personal information
- Nationality: (Wales) Welsh
- Born: 16 October 1994 (age 31)
- Weight: Super-lightweight

Boxing career

Boxing record
- Total fights: 18
- Wins: 16
- Win by KO: 3
- Losses: 1
- Draws: 1

Ben Crocker (born 16 October 1994) is a Welsh professional boxer who was IBF European super-lightweight champion from December 2024 to September 2025.

== Career ==
Crocker started boxing aged 12 when he switched from kickboxing. He made his professional debut in September 2021 and amassed a perfect record of 13 wins from 13 fights, before defeating Stelios Papadopoulos by unanimous decision for the vacant International Boxing Federation European super-lightweight title at the Brentwood Centre in Essex on 7 December 2024.

His first title defense was against Tiernan Bradley at York Hall in Bethnal Green on 4 April 2025, and ended in a split draw. One judge favoured each boxer 97–93 with the third scoring the bout a 95–95 tie.

Crocker made the second defense of his title against Seán McComb at Park Community Arena in Sheffield on 27 September 2025. He lost by unanimous decision.
