= Leodan Pezo =

Peruvian boxer (born 1993)

Personal information
- Born: 7 November 1993 (age 32) Contamana, Peru

Sport
- Sport: Boxing
Medal record
Representing Peru
Pan American Games
Bronze medal – third place	2019 Lima	60 kg

Leodan Pezo (born 7 November 1993) is a Peruvian boxer. He competed in the men's lightweight event at the 2020 Summer Olympics.
