= Elvis Rodriguez =

Dominican boxer (born 1996)

Personal information
- Nickname: Dominican Kid
- Nationality: Dominican
- Born: Elvis Severino Rodriguez Mendoza; 14 January 1996 (age 30) Santo Domingo, Dominican Republic
- Height: 5 ft 10 1/2 in (179 cm)
- Weight: Light welterweight

Boxing career
- Reach: 71 in (180 cm)
- Stance: Southpaw

Boxing record
- Total fights: 21
- Wins: 18
- Win by KO: 14
- Losses: 2
- Draws: 1

Elvis Severino Rodriguez Mendoza (born 14 January 1996) is a Dominican professional boxer. As an amateur, he competed at the 2017 World Championships.

== Professional career ==
Rodriguez made his professional debut on 9 November 2018, scoring a third-round technical knockout (TKO) victory against Valentin Juan Ortiz Hernandez at the Big Punch Arena in Tijuana, Mexico.

Rodriguez is scheduled for his 2024 ring return at James L. Knight Center in Miami, FL on June 29, 2024.

== Professional boxing record ==
| 21 fights | 18 wins | 2 losses |
|---|---|---|
| By knockout | 14 | 0 |
| By decision | 4 | 2 |
| Draws | 1 | |

| No. | Result | Record | Opponent | Type | Round, time | Date | Location | Notes |
|---|---|---|---|---|---|---|---|---|
| 21 | Win | 18–2–1 | Alejandro Frias Rodriguez | KO | 2 (10), 2:59 | Oct 18, 2025 | Thunder Studios, Long Beach, California, U.S. | |
| 20 | Loss | 17–2–1 | Lindolfo Delgado | MD | 10 | Apr 5, 2025 | Palms Casino Resort, Las Vegas, Nevada, U.S. | For WBO Latino Super-lightweight title |
| 19 | Win | 17–1–1 | Kendo Castaneda | UD | 10 | Sep 27, 2024 | Madison Square Garden Theater, New York City, New York, U.S. | |
| 18 | Win | 16–1–1 | Jino Rodrigo | UD | 10 | 29 Jun 2024 | James L. Knight Center, Miami Beach, Florida, U.S. | |
| 17 | Win | 15–1–1 | Viktor Postol | TKO | 7 (10), 0:23 | 15 Jul 2023 | Cosmopolitan of Las Vegas, Las Vegas, Nevada, U.S. | |
| 16 | Win | 14–1–1 | Joseph Adorno | MD | 10 | 25 Feb 2023 | Minneapolis Armory, Minneapolis, Minnesota, U.S. | |
| 15 | Win | 13–1–1 | Juan Jose Velasco | KO | 7 (10), 2:55 | 26 Mar 2022 | Minneapolis Armory, Minneapolis, Minnesota, U.S. | |
| 14 | Win | 12–1–1 | Juan Pablo Romero | KO | 5 (10), 2:59 | Nov 6, 2021 | MGM Grand Garden Arena, Paradise, Nevada, U.S. | |
| 13 | Loss | 11–1–1 | Kenneth Sims Jr. | MD | 8 | May 22, 2021 | Virgin Hotels Las Vegas, Paradise, Nevada, U.S. | For vacant WBC–USNBC super lightweight title |
| 12 | Win | 11–0–1 | Luis Alberto Veron | UD | 8 | Feb 20, 2021 | MGM Grand Conference Center, Paradise, Nevada, U.S. | |
| 11 | Win | 10–0–1 | Cameron Krael | KO | 3 (8), 0:53 | Oct 9, 2020 | MGM Grand Conference Center, Paradise, Nevada, U.S. | |
| 10 | Win | 9–0–1 | Cody Wilson | KO | 3 (6), 1:03 | Aug 29, 2020 | MGM Grand Conference Center, Paradise, Nevada, U.S. | |
| 9 | Win | 8–0–1 | Dennis Okoth | KO | 2 (6), 2:33 | Jul 21, 2020 | MGM Grand Conference Center, Paradise, Nevada, U.S. | |
| 8 | Win | 7–0–1 | Danny Murray | TKO | 1 (6), 2:13 | Jul 2, 2020 | MGM Grand Conference Center, Paradise, Nevada, U.S. | |
| 7 | Win | 6–0–1 | Kaylyn Alfred | TKO | 6 (6), 1:11 | Feb 21, 2020 | Miccosukee Resort & Gaming, Miami, Florida, US | |
| 6 | Win | 5–0–1 | Luis Norambuena | KO | 4 (6), 0:45 | Nov 2, 2019 | Dignity Health Sports Park, Carson, California, U.S. | |
| 5 | Win | 4–0–1 | Ramon Cascarena | KO | 3 (6), 1:56 | Sep 20, 2019 | Commerce Casino, Commerce, California, U.S. | |
| 4 | Win | 3–0–1 | Jesus Gonzalez | KO | 1 (6), 1:42 | Aug 17, 2019 | Banc of California Stadium, Los Angeles, California, U.S. | |
| 3 | Draw | 2–0–1 | Joaquin Chávez | TD | 1 (6), 2:28 | Jun 28, 2019 | Pechanga Resort & Casino, Temecula, California, U.S. | |
| 2 | Win | 2–0 | Kevin Alfonso Luna | KO | 2 (4), 2:59 | Apr 12, 2019 | Staples Center, Los Angeles, California, U.S. | |
| 1 | Win | 1–0 | Valentin Juan Ortiz Hernandez | TKO | 3 (4), 2:14 | Nov 9, 2018 | Big Punch Arena, Tijuana, Mexico | |
