= César Vázquez =

Mexican boxer (born 1986)

Personal information
- Nickname: Saba
- Born: César Gustavo Vázquez Gómez; 16 January 1986 (age 40) Mexicali, Baja California, Mexico
- Height: 1.80 m (5 ft 11 in)
- Weight: Lightweight; Super Featherweight

Boxing career
- Reach: 184 cm (72 in)
- Stance: Orthodox

Boxing record
- Total fights: 31
- Wins: 27
- Win by KO: 16
- Losses: 4
- Draws: 0
- No contests: 0

César Gustavo Vázquez Gómez (born 16 January 1986) is a Mexican professional boxer and the current WBC Mundo Hispano Super Featherweight Champion.

== Professional career ==
In June 2010, Vázquez beat the veteran Luis Gonzalez to capture the WBC FECOMBOX Super Featherweight Championship.

On October 29, 2010 César knocked out Antonio Meza to win the WBC Mundo Hispano Super Featherweight Championship.
