= Ranfis Encarnación =

Dominican Republic boxer

Personal information
- Nickname: La Ensalada
- Nationality: Dominican
- Born: Ranfis Javier Encarnación; 26 January 1996 (age 30) San Cristóbal, Dominican Republic
- Weight: Bantamweight; Super bantamweight Featherweight

Boxing career

Boxing record
- Total fights: 18
- Wins: 17
- Win by KO: 13
- Losses: 1

Ranfis Javier Encarnación (born 26 January 1996) is a Dominican professional boxer who held the WBA Fedebol featherweight title in 2019. As of May 2020, he is ranked as the world's seventh-best active featherweight by the IBF.

== Professional career ==
Encarnación made his professional debut on 19 December 2014, defeating Juan Rivas via second-round technical knockout (TKO) in Santo Domingo. A year later he won the vacant WBA Fedecaribe bantamweight title in his seventh bout, stopping Angelo Muñoz (15–4, 10 KO) by TKO. In September 2018, the undefeated fighter signed a promotional deal with Sampson Lewkowicz of Sampson Boxing. Two months later, he beat Venezuelan rival Milner Marcano (17–0, 13 KO) in Santo Domingo with a second-round TKO for the vacant WBA Fedecaribe super bantamweight title.

His next fight was his first outside of his homeland: a match-up against Argentine prospect Sergio Martin Sosa (10–1, 3 KO) in Montevideo, Uruguay for the vacant WBA Fedebol featherweight title. He defeated Sosa by unanimous decision (UD) on 26 January 2019 to win his third title in three different weight classes. Three months later he fought on the undercard of the Rances Barthelemy–Robert Easter Jr. world title fight at the Cosmopolitan of Las Vegas, stopping Mexican opponent José Bustos (14–9–3, 9 KO) in the second round to move to 16–0.

== Professional boxing record ==
18 fights	17 wins	1 loss
By knockout	13	1
By decision	2	0
By disqualification	2	0

No.	Result	Record	Opponent	Type	Round, time	Date	Location	Notes
18	Loss	17–1	(United States) Vic Pasillas	KO	6 (10), 2:29	23 Sep 2020	(United States) Microsoft Theater, Los Angeles, California, U.S.	
17	Win	17–0	(Mexico) Emmanuel Domínguez	KO	1 (10), 1:59	2 Nov 2019	(United States) MGM National Harbor, Oxon Hill, Maryland, U.S.	
16	Win	16–0	(Mexico) José Bustos	TKO	2 (8), 0:48	27 Apr 2019	(United States) Cosmopolitan of Las Vegas, Paradise, Nevada, U.S.	
15	Win	15–0	(Argentina) Sergio Martin Sosa	UD	9	26 Jan 2019	Radisson Victoria Plaza, Montevideo, Uruguay	Won vacant WBA Fedebol featherweight title
14	Win	14–0	(Venezuela) Milner Marcano	TKO	2 (9), 1:40	30 Nov 2018	Hotel Dominican Fiesta, Santo Domingo, Dominican Republic	Won vacant WBA Fedecaribe super bantamweight title
13	Win	13–0	(Venezuela) Robinson Garcia	KO	5 (6), 1:27	29 Apr 2018	Club El Millón, Santo Domingo, Dominican Republic	
12	Win	12–0	(Dominican Republic) Jael Made	TKO	4 (6)	14 Sep 2017	Hotel Jaragua, Santo Domingo, Dominican Republic	
11	Win	11–0	(Dominican Republic) Luis Charlas	DQ	? (6)	28 Jul 2017	Cancha Villa Consuelo, Santo Domingo, Dominican Republic	
10	Win	10–0	(Venezuela) Jesús Vargas	TKO	5 (8), 1:57	23 Sep 2016	Salón de Eventos P. C. Sambil, Santo Domingo, Dominican Republic	
9	Win	9–0	(Dominican Republic) Reysi Rosa	KO	1 (6), 2:51	15 Jul 2016	Club Maquiteria, Santo Domingo, Dominican Republic	
8	Win	8–0	(Dominican Republic) Geyci Lorenzo	DQ	6 (6), 2:51	6 Feb 2016	Hotel Jaragua, Santo Domingo, Dominican Republic	
7	Win	7–0	(Dominican Republic) Angelo Muñoz	TKO	5 (9), 1:50	12 Dec 2015	Polideportivo de Haina, Santo Domingo, Dominican Republic	Won vacant WBA Fedecaribe bantamweight title
6	Win	6–0	(Dominican Republic) Robert Montilla	RTD	4 (6), 3:00	26 Sep 2015	Parque del Este, Santo Domingo, Dominican Republic	
5	Win	5–0	(Dominican Republic) Jael Made	TKO	4 (6), 2:14	11 Jul 2015	Polideportivo de Villa Francisca, Santo Domingo, Dominican Republic	
4	Win	4–0	(Dominican Republic) Geyci Lorenzo	UD	4	29 Mar 2015	Cancha Club Alonzo Perdomo, Santo Domingo, Dominican Republic	
3	Win	3–0	(Dominican Republic) Nelson Diaz	TKO	1 (4), 2:30	13 Feb 2015	Polideportivo Laguna Salada, Mao, Dominican Republic	
2	Win	2–0	(Dominican Republic) Ramon Emilio Cedano	KO	4 (4), 1:09	10 Jan 2015	Casa de los Clubes, Santo Domingo, Dominican Republic	
1	Win	1–0	(Dominican Republic) Juan Rivas	TKO	2 (4), 2:58	19 Dec 2014	Parque del Este, Santo Domingo, Dominican Republic	
