= Xavier Martinez (boxer) =

American boxer

Personal information
- Born: Xavier Augustine Martinez; 25 October 1997 (age 28) Sacramento, California, U.S.
- Height: 5 ft 8 in (173 cm)
- Weight: Super featherweight

Boxing career
- Reach: 70 in (178 cm)
- Stance: Orthodox

Boxing record
- Total fights: 19
- Wins: 18
- Win by KO: 12
- Losses: 1

Xavier Augustine Martinez (born 25 October 1997) is an American professional boxer.

== Professional boxing career ==
Martinez made his professional debut against Mario Hernandez on 25 June 2015. He won the fight by unanimous decision. Martinez amassed an 11–0 record during the next three years, with 7 of those victories coming by way of stoppage. Martinez had his first step-up in competition on 22 September 2018, when he was scheduled to face Oscar Bravo. He won the fight by a sixth-round technical knockout.

Martinez was booked to face John Vincent Moralde on 5 April 2019, on the undercard of the Angelo Leo and Neil John Tabanao featherweight bout. He won the fight by a third-round technical knockout. Martinez faced Jessie Cris Rosales in the main event of a Showtime broadcast card on 1 November 2019. He won the fight by a first-round knockout, stopping Rosales with a left-right combination after just 21 seconds.

Martinez faced Claudio Marrero Claudio Marrero on 24 October 2020. The fight was scheduled as the co-headliner of the IBF interim welterweight title fight between Sergey Lipinets and Custio Clayton. He won the fight by unanimous decision, with two judges scoring the fight 114–112 and one judge scoring the fight 115–111 in his favor. Marrero had the most success in the eight round, when he nearly finished Martinez, as he knocked him down twice.

Martinez was expected to face Abraham Montoya on 15 May 2021, on the undercard of the Brandon Figueroa and Luis Nery super bantamweight title unification bout. On 4 May, fight promoters PBC announced that Montoya had withdrawn from the fight, and would be replaced by the two-time WBO super featherweight title challenger Juan Carlos Burgos. He won the fight by unanimous decision, with all three judges scoring the fight 99–91 in his favor.

On 21 December 2021, it was announced that Martinez would face the one-time WBC super featherweight title challenger Robson Conceição in a WBC title eliminator. The fight was scheduled as the main event of an ESPN and ESPN Deportes broadcast card, which took place on 29 January 2022. Martinez lost the fight by unanimous decision, with scores of 98–92, 99–91 and 100–90. His only moments of success came in the third round, when he managed to stagger Conceição with a left hook.

== Professional boxing record ==
19 fights	18 wins	1 loss
By knockout	12	0
By decision	6	1

No.	Result	Record	Opponent	Type	Round, time	Date	Location	Notes
19	Win	18–1	Alejandro Guerrero	KO	5 (8), 2:00	20 Aug 2022	Pechanga Arena, San Diego, California, U.S.	
18	Loss	17–1	Robson Conceição	UD	10	29 Jan 2022	Hard Rock Hotel & Casino, Tulsa, U.S.	
17	Win	17–0	Juan Carlos Burgos	UD	10	15 May 2021	Dignity Health Sports Park, Carson, U.S.	
16	Win	16–0	Claudio Marrero	UD	12	24 Oct 2020	Mohegan Sun Casino, Uncasville, U.S.	
15	Win	15–0	Jessie Cris Rosales	KO	1 (10), 0:21	1 Nov 2019	Sam's Town Hotel & Gambling Hall, Las Vegas, U.S.	
14	Win	14–0	John Vincent Moralde	TKO	3 (10), 1:11	5 Apr 2019	Sam's Town Hotel & Gambling Hall, Las Vegas, U.S.	
13	Win	13–0	Deivi Julio	KO	5 (8), 1:52	9 Feb 2019	Dignity Health Sports Park, Carson, U.S.	
12	Win	12–0	Oscar Bravo	TKO	6 (8), 2:47	22 Sep 2018	Sam's Town Hotel & Gambling Hall, Las Vegas, U.S.	
11	Win	11–0	Jairo Vargas	TKO	2 (8), 1:22	7 Apr 2018	Hard Rock Hotel and Casino, Las Vegas, U.S.	
10	Win	10–0	Raymond Chacon	KO	2 (6), 3:00	21 Oct 2017	Armory, San Francisco, U.S.	
9	Win	9–0	Jesus Aguinaga	RTD	5 (8), 3:00	8 Sep 2017	Hard Rock Hotel and Casino, Las Vegas, U.S.	
8	Win	8–0	Prince Smalls	UD	8	20 Jun 2017	Sam's Town Hotel & Gambling Hall, Las Vegas, U.S.	
7	Win	7–0	Wilfredo Garriga Casiano	UD	6	8 Oct 2016	Sam's Town Hotel & Gambling Hall, Las Vegas, U.S.	
6	Win	6–0	Gabriel Gutierrez	KO	4 (6), 2:00	2 Apr 2016	Oceanview Pavilion, Port Hueneme, U.S.	
5	Win	5–0	Jorge Sillas Amor	TKO	3 (6), 2:26	19 Mar 2016	Billar El Perro Salado, Tijuana, Mexico	
4	Win	4–0	Julio Marquez	TKO	1 (4), 1:44	18 Dec 2015	Billar El Perro Salado, Tijuana, Mexico	
3	Win	3–0	Cristian Felix Perez	TKO	1 (4), 0:58	11 Dec 2015	Billar El Perro Salado, Tijuana, Mexico	
2	Win	2–0	Rafael Busuioc	UD	4	22 Aug 2015	Churchill County Fairgrounds, Fallon, U.S.	
1	Win	1–0	Mario Hernandez	UD	4	25 Jun 2015	Billar El Perro Salado, Tijuana, Mexico	
