= Berik Abdrakhmanov =

Kazakhstani boxer (born 1986)

Medal record

Representing Kazakhstan

Men's Amateur boxing

World Championships
Bronze medal – third place	2013 Almaty	Lightweight

Asian Championships
Gold medal – first place	2013 Amman	Lightweight

Berik Abdrakhmanov (born 20 June 1986) is a Kazakhstani amateur boxer in the lightweight division who competed at the 2013 World Championships, won the Bronze medal along with Domenico Valentino of Italy. He also represented Kazakhstan at the 2016 Summer Olympics.
