= Luis Angel Cabrera =

Venezuelan boxer (born 1995)

Luís Cabrera
Personal information
- Full name: Luís Ángel Cabrera Machado
- Born: 20 May 1995 (age 31) San Felix, Venezuela

Sport
- Sport: Boxing
Medal record
Men's amateur boxing
Representing Venezuela
Pan American Games
Bronze medal – third place	2019 Lima	Lightweight
South American Games
Silver medal – second place	2018 Cochabamba	Lightweight

Luís Ángel Cabrera Machado (Note: In this Spanish name, the first or paternal surname is Cabrera and the second or maternal family name is Machado.) (born 20 May 1995) is a Venezuelan boxer. Cabrera competed in the men's lightweight event at the 2016 Summer Olympics.

Competing in the same weight class, he won a silver medal at the 2018 South American Games and a bronze medal at the 2019 Pan American Games.
