= Ángel Rodríguez (boxer) =

Argentine boxer

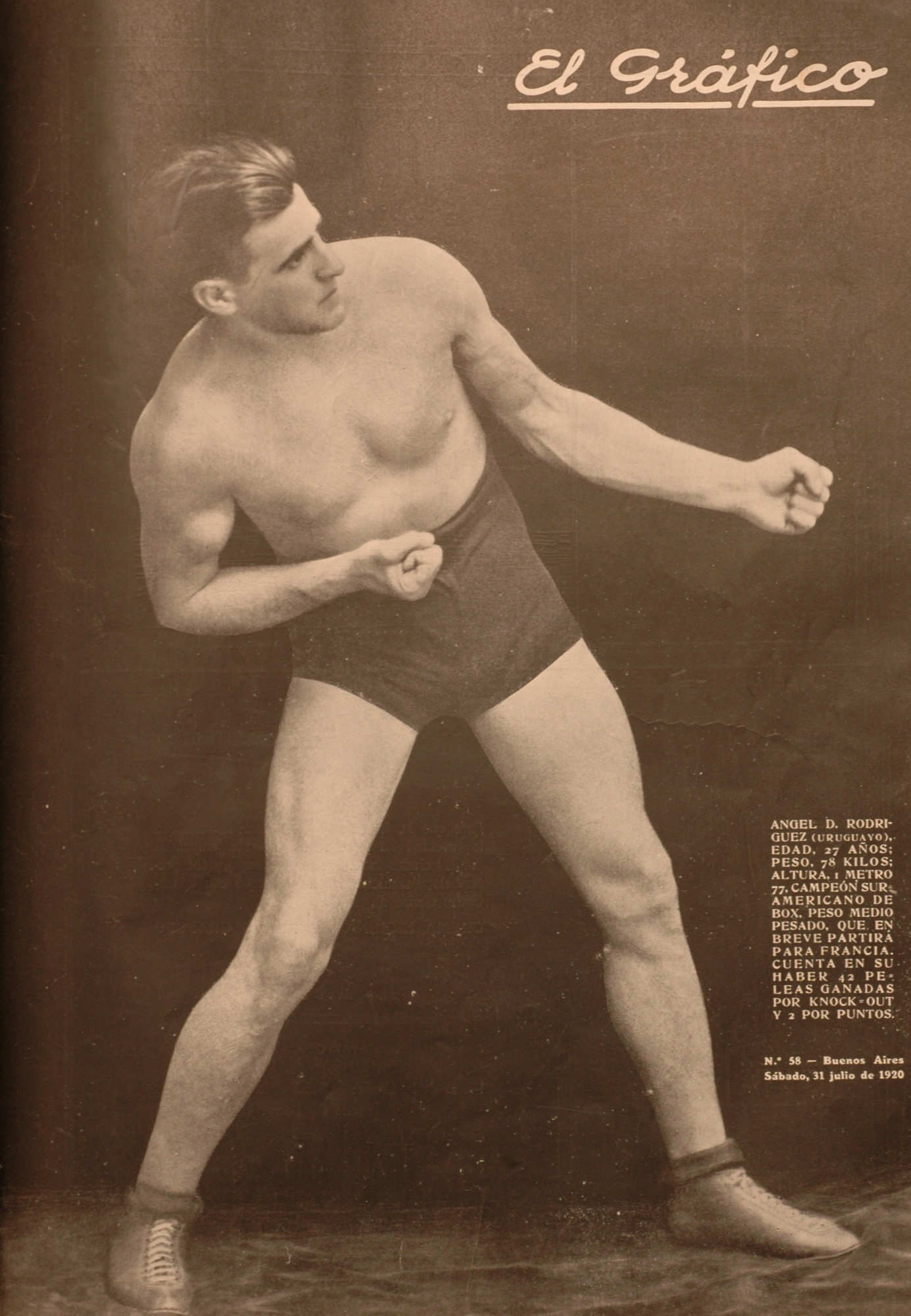

Personal information
- Nationality: Argentinian

Sport
- Country: Argentina
- Sport: Boxing

Angel Rodriguez was a boxer that competed at the 1920 Summer Olympics in the featherweight division. He was defeated by Arthur Olsen in the round of 32. He was the only Argentinian athlete to participate in these games.

== See also ==
- Argentina at the 1920 Summer Olympics
