= Seán McComb =

Irish boxer (born 1992)

Personal information
- Nicknames: The Public Nuisance, Sugar, Bang Bang Gravy Chip
- Nationality: Irish
- Born: 14 August 1992 (age 33) Antrim, County Antrim, Northern Ireland
- Height: 6 ft 0 1/2 in (184 cm)
- Weight: Light-welterweight

Boxing career
- Stance: Southpaw

Boxing record
- Total fights: 24
- Wins: 22
- Win by KO: 6
- Losses: 2
Medal record
Representing Ireland
European Games
Bronze medal – third place	2015 Baku	Lightweight

Seán McComb (born 14 August 1992) is an Irish professional boxer. He has held the IBF European super-lightweight title since September 2025 and is also a former WBO European super-lightweight champion. As an amateur, McComb won a bronze medal at the 2015 European Games.

== Amateur career ==
McComb trains at the Holy Trinity club, Belfast.

McComb won bronze at the 2015 European Games in Baku.

McComb represented Northern Ireland in the 2018 Commonwealth Games, losing to England's Luke McCormack at the round of 16 stage.

== Professional career ==
McComb won the vacant WBO European super-lightweight title with a unanimous decision victory over the previously unbeaten Zsolt Osadan at the SSE Arena in Belfast on 10 December 2022.

He successfully retained the title with unanimous decision wins over Kaisee Benjamin at the bp pulse LIVE Arena in Birmingham on 6 May 2023 and Sam Maxwell back at the SSE Arena in Belfast on 2 December 2023.

McComb challenged WBO Intercontinental super-lightweight champion Arnold Barboza Jr at the Barclays Center in Brooklyn, New York on 20 April 2024, losing by split decision with one of the ringside judges scoring the fight 98–92 in his favour, while the other two had it 97–93 and 96–94 respectively for his opponent.

After more than 14 months inactivity, he returned to the competitive boxing ring at the Connexin Live Arena in Hull on 28 June 2025, defeating Alexis Nahuel Torres on points in a six-round bout.

McComb challenged IBF European super-lightweight champion Ben Crocker at Park Community Arena in Sheffield, England, on 27 September 2025. He won by unanimous decision.

He made the first defense of the title against Hugo Micallef at Salle des Étoiles in Monte Carlo on 6 December 2025, winning by stoppage in the eighth round.

== Personal life ==
McComb was fined and issued with ban after an incident outside a nightclub in 2018.

== Professional boxing record ==
24 fights	22 wins	2 losses
By knockout	6	1
By decision	16	1

No.	Result	Record	Opponent	Type	Round, time	Date	Location	Notes
24	Win	22–2	(Argentina) Miguel Cesario Antin	PTS	6	1 Aug 2026	(Republic of Ireland) 3Arena, Dublin, Ireland	
23	Win	21–2	(Monaco) Hugo Micallef	TKO	8 (10), 2:35	6 Dec 2025	Salle des Etoiles, Monte Carlo, Monaco	Retained IBF European super-lightweight title
22	Win	20–2	(United Kingdom) Ben Crocker	UD	10	27 Sep 2025	(United Kingdom) Park Community Arena, Sheffield, England	Won IBF European super-lightweight title
21	Win	19–2	(Argentina) Alexis Nahuel Torres	UD	6	28 Jun 2025	(United Kingdom) Connexin Live Arena, Hull, England	
20	Loss	18–2	(United States) Arnold Barboza Jr.	SD	10	20 Apr 2024	(United States) Barclays Center, Brooklyn, New York, U.S.	For WBO Inter-Continental super lightweight title
19	Win	18–1	(United Kingdom) Sam Maxwell	UD	10	2 Dec 2023	(United Kingdom) SSE Arena, Belfast, Northern Ireland	Retained WBO European super lightweight title
18	Win	17–1	(Spain) Alejandro Moya	UD	10	4 Aug 2023	(United Kingdom) Falls Park, Belfast, Northern Ireland	
17	Win	16–1	(United Kingdom) Kaisee Benjamin	UD	10	6 May 2023	(United Kingdom) Resorts World Arena, Birmingham, England	Retained WBO European super lightweight title
16	Win	15–1	(Slovakia) Zsolt Osadan	UD	10	10 Dec 2022	(United Kingdom) SSE Arena, Belfast, Northern Ireland	Won vacant WBO European super lightweight title
15	Win	14–1	(Nicaragua) Ramiro Blanco	PTS	6	6 Aug 2022	(United Kingdom) SSE Arena, Belfast, Northern Ireland	
14	Win	13–1	(Scotland) Ronnie Clark	PTS	8	5 Nov 2021	(United Kingdom) Ulster Hall, Belfast, Northern Ireland	
13	Win	12–1	(Argentina) Vicente Martin Rodriguez	PTS	8	6 Aug 2021	(United Kingdom) Falls Park, Belfast, Northern Ireland	
12	Loss	11–1	(United Kingdom) Gavin Gwynne	TKO	7 (12), 2:09	19 Feb 2021	(United Kingdom) Bolton Whites Hotel, Lancashire, England	
11	Win	11–0	(Turkey) Siar Ozgul	UD	10	11 Aug 2020	(United Kingdom) LS-Live, Wakefield, England	
10	Win	10–0	(Argentina) Mauro Godoy	RTD	6 (10), 3:00	1 Feb 2020	(United Kingdom) Ulster Hall, Belfast, Northern Ireland	
9	Win	9–0	(Argentina) Emiliano Rodriguez	PTS	8	11 Oct 2019	(United Kingdom) Ulster Hall, Belfast, Northern Ireland	
8	Win	8–0	(France) Renald Garrido	PTS	8	3 Aug 2019	(United Kingdom) Falls Park, Belfast, Northern Ireland	
7	Win	7–0	(Czech Republic) Miroslav Serban	TKO	1 (8), 1:24	17 May 2019	(United Kingdom) Ulster Hall, Belfast, Northern Ireland	
6	Win	6–0	(United Kingdom) Troy James	PTS	6	29 Mar 2018	(United Kingdom) Ulster Hall, Belfast, Northern Ireland	
5	Win	5–0	(Hungary) Zoltan Szabo	PTS	6	7 Dec 2018	(United Kingdom) Titanic Exhibition Centre, Belfast, Northern Ireland	
4	Win	4–0	(Peru) Carlos Galindo	TKO	2 (4), 2:13	20 Oct 2018	(United States) TD Garden, Boston, Massachusetts, US	
3	Win	3–0	(Bulgaria) Petar Aleksandrov	PTS	4	5 Oct 2018	(United Kingdom) Titanic Exhibition Centre, Belfast, Northern Ireland	
2	Win	2–0	(Nicaragua) Lester Cantillano	TKO	2 (4), 2:56	8 Sep 2018	(United Kingdom) Arena Birmingham, Birmingham, England	
1	Win	1–0	(Nicaragua) Reynaldo Mora	TKO	4 (4), 1:53	18 Aug 2018	(United Kingdom) Windsor Park, Belfast, Northern Ireland	
