= Lindolfo Delgado =

Mexican boxer (born 1994)

Personal information
- Born: 31 December 1994 (age 31) Linares, Nuevo León, Mexico
- Height: 5 ft 9 in (1.75 m)
- Weight: Light welterweight

Boxing career
- Reach: 68 in (173 cm)
- Stance: Orthodox

Boxing record
- Total fights: 24
- Wins: 24
- Win by KO: 16
- Losses: 0
Medal record
Men's amateur boxing
Representing Mexico
Pan American Games
Silver medal – second place	2015 Toronto	Lightweight
Central American and Caribbean Games
Silver medal – second place	2014 Veracruz	Lightweight

Lindolfo Delgado Garza (born 31 December 1994) is a Mexican professional boxer. As an amateur, he competed in the men's lightweight event at the 2016 Summer Olympics, where he lost his first bout.

== Professional career ==
On 29 March 2024 in Glendale, Arizona, Delgado was scheduled to face Carlos Sanchez in a 10-round bout at junior welterweight. Delgado won the fight by knockout in the seventh round.

Delgado is scheduled to face Elvis Rodriguez in Las Vegas on 5 April 2025.

== Professional boxing record ==
24 fights	24 wins	0 losses
By knockout	16	0
By decision	8	0

No.	Result	Record	Opponent	Type	Round, time	Date	Location	Notes
23	Win	24–0	Gabriel Gollaz Valenzuela	SD	12	15 November 2025	Arena Coliseo, San Luis Potosí, Mexico	
23	Win	23–0	Elvis Rodriguez	MD	10	5 April 2025	Palms Casino Resort, Las Vegas, Nevada, U.S.	Retained WBO Latino Super-lightweight Title
22	Win	22–0	Jackson Marinez	TKO	5 (10), 2:14	7 December 2024	Footprint Center, Phoenix, Arizona, U.S.	Retained WBO Latino Super-lightweight Title
21	Win	21–0	Bryan Flores	SD	10	10 August 2024	Tingley Coliseum, Albuquerque, New Mexico, U.S.	Won vacant WBO Latino Super-lightweight Title
20	Win	20–0	Carlos Sanchez	KO	7 (10), 0:48	29 March 2024	Desert Diamond Arena, Glendale, Arizona, U.S.	
19	Win	19–0	Luis Hernandez Ramos	KO	4 (8), 1:53	4 November 2023	Tahoe Blue Event Center, Stateline, Nevada, U.S.	
18	Win	18–0	Jair Valtierra	UD	10	12 August 2023	Desert Diamond Arena, Glendale, Arizona, U.S.	
17	Win	17–0	Clarance Booth	UD	8	3 February 2023	Desert Diamond Arena, Glendale, Arizona, U.S.	
16	Win	16–0	Omar Alejandro Aguilar	UD	8	20 August 2022	Pechanga Arena, San Diego, California, U.S.	
15	Win	15–0	Gustavo David Vittori	KO	2 (8), 2:10	9 April 2022	The Hangar, Costa Mesa, California, U.S.	
14	Win	14–0	Juan Garcia Mendez	UD	8	15 October 2021	Pechanga Arena, San Diego, California, U.S.	
13	Win	13–0	Miguel Zamudio	TKO	2 (8), 0:50	10 September 2021	Casino Del Sol, Tucson, Arizona, U.S.	
12	Win	12–0	Salvador Briceno	UD	8	19 June 2021	Virgin Hotels Las Vegas, Paradise, Nevada, U.S.	
11	Win	11–0	Jesus Zazueta Anaya	KO	6 (6), 1:59	28 Sep 2019	Staples Center, Los Angeles, California, U.S.	
10	Win	10–0	Eduardo Cordovez	TKO	3 (8), 2:47	1 June 2019	Gimnasio Municipal del Pueblo Mágico, Linares, Mexico	
9	Win	9–0	James Roach	KO	1 (6), 2:59	16 March 2019	AT&T Stadium, Arlington, Texas, U.S.	
8	Win	8–0	Sergio López	KO	3 (8), 2:48	13 January 2019	Microsoft Theater, Los Angeles, California, U.S.	
7	Win	7–0	Luis Humberto Moreno	TKO	6 (6), 1:25	20 October 2018	Centro de Convenciones, Cozumel, Mexico	
6	Win	6–0	Ricardo Rico Pozos	TKO	5 (8)	1 September 2018	Palenque de la Expo, Ciudad Obregón, Mexico	
5	Win	5–0	Jose Luis Ávalos	TKO	3 (8), 1:21	9 June 2018	Gimnasio Nuevo León Unido, Monterrey, Mexico	
4	Win	4–0	Juan Carlos Chavira	TKO	4 (6), 0:48	7 April 2018	Hotel Azul Ixtapa, Ixtapa, Mexico	
3	Win	3–0	Hector Mendoza	TKO	3 (6), 2:34	10 February 2018	Gimnasio Municipal "Jose Neri Santos", Ciudad Juárez, Mexico	
2	Win	2–0	Gerson Escobar	TKO	1 (6), 0:58	22 July 2017	Lienzo Charro Parral, Parral, Mexico	
1	Win	1–0	Luis Ángel Silva	TKO	3 (4), 0:33	9 April 2017	The Novo at L.A. Live, Los Angeles, California, U.S.	
