= India women's national boxing team =

National sports team

The India women's national boxing team represents India in international boxing competitions. It is administered by the Boxing Federation of India (BFI) which is the official national governing body for amateur boxing in India. It is a member of World Boxing. BFI is headquartered in Gurugram, Haryana.

== History ==
In 1925, the first governing body for boxing in India, Bombay Presidency Amateur Boxing Federation was formed in Mumbai. Mostly due to the efforts of HV Pointon, the President of the Bombay Presidency Amateur Boxing Federation (1944–48), Indian Amateur Boxing Federation was founded on 25 February 1949. Major FG Baker became the first secretary at the inaugural meeting at the Governor's Pavilion of the Cricket Club of India in Mumbai. Bombay (Mumbai) became the headquarters of the body. The first national championships were held at the Brabourne Stadium in Mumbai in March 1950.

Indian Boxing Federation was also known as Indian Amateur Boxing Federation (IABF) and was suspended by the International Amateur Boxing Association in 2014, following which BFI was recognised as the official body.

== Notable performances ==
Mary Kom is a six-time World Amateur Boxing champion, and the only woman boxer to have won a medal in each of the six world championships. She also became the first Indian woman boxer to win a Gold Medal at the Asian Games during the 2014 Asian Games in Incheon, South Korea. In the London Olympics 2012, where women's boxing was introduced, Mary Kom won a bronze in the flyweight (51kg) category. In 202o, Lovlina Borgohain also won an Olympic boxing bronze medal at Tokyo in the welterweight (69kg) category.

== World Boxing Cup Finals 2025 ==
The following women boxers took part in the World Boxing Cup Finals 2025 at the Shaheed Vijay Singh Pathik Sports Complex, Greater Noida which concluded on 20 November 2025. Indian women won seven gold medals.

1. Minakshi Hooda - gold medal in 48kg
2. Nikhat Zareen - gold medal in 51kg
3. Preeti Pawar - gold medal in 54kg
4. Jaismine Lamboria - gold medal in 57kg
5. Arundhati Choudhary - gold medal in 70kg
6. Nupur Sheoran - gold medal in 80+kg
7. Parveen Hooda - gold medal in 60kg
8. Pooja Rani - silver medal in 80kg
9. Neeraj Phogat - bronze medal in 65kg
10. Saweety Boora - bronze medal in 75kg

== See also ==
- Boxing in India
- Boxing Federation of India
