= WBA Asia =

Boxing organisation

- Sport: Professional boxing
- Abbreviation: WBA Asia
- Founded: 2014
- Affiliation: WBA (2017–present); WBC (2014–2016)
- Headquarters: Seoul, South Korea
- President: Alan Kim
- Secretary: Won Kim
- Operating income: Title match sanction fee

Official website
- wbaasiaboxing.com
- (South Korea)

WBA Asia (formerly known as Eurasia Pacific Boxing Council, also known as EPBC) is an organisation for professional boxing in the Central Asia, Oceania, Pan Pacific, Eurasia and Southeast and Far East nations. Formed in 2014, it is headquartered in Seoul.

== History ==
=== WBC affiliation ===
In 2016, WBC released an open letter, stating the following:

Eurasia Pacific Boxing Council is not a WBC Federation. It is only a committee affiliated with the WBC. Any request for a new federation or commission to affiliate to the WBC is a matter that must be addressed by the WBC Board of Governors in the annual conventions of the WBC. This open letter came about due to MBC claimed that they have secured affiliation with WBC. However WBC shot the affiliation down and stated that MBC only has affiliation with EPBC and not WBC. In February 2017, EPBC announced that they will be leaving the WBC to join WBA.

=== WBA affiliation ===
In February 2017, WBA Asia was accepted by WBA president Gilberto Jesús Mendoza. The final was on March 25 with Pavel Malikov won over Mirzhan Zhaksylykov for the WBA ASIA Lightweight title match. This was created alongside WBA Oceania title to replace the Pan Asian Boxing Association title which left and created their own sanctioning body called the World Boxing Society.

== WBA Asia champions ==
Weight Class	Asia Regular Champion	Asia Gold Champion	Asia East Champion	Asia South Champion	Asia Central Champion	Asia Female Champion
Heavyweight	(China) Yize Jiang	not inaugurated	vacant	vacant	vacant	vacant
Bridgerweight	(Tajikistan) Davlat Boltaev	not inaugurated	vacant	vacant	vacant	vacant
Cruiserweight	vacant	not inaugurated	(Turkey) Hasan Kubilay Alcu	vacant	vacant	vacant
Light heavyweight	(Kazakhstan) Ali Akhmedov	not inaugurated	vacant	(England) Connor Taylor	vacant	vacant
Super middleweight	(Serbia) Vladimir Mironchikov	not inaugurated	vacant	(England) Jimmy Kelly	vacant	vacant
Middleweight	(Kazakhstan) Armat Aramanuly	(England) JJ Metcalf	(Czech Republic) Robert Toman	(Indonesia) Sarohatua Lumbantobing	(Russia) Konstantin Mishechkin	vacant
Super welterweight	(Kazakhstan) Alisher Abdulalim	(Mexico) Jesus Saracho	(South Korea) Yong-In Jo	(Philippines) Jhun Rick Carcedo	vacant	vacant
Welterweight	(Kazakhstan) Ruslan Madiyev	not inaugurated	(Indonesia) James Mokoginta	(Argentina) Alberto Ignacio Palmetta	(Russia) Danis Gabdrafikov	vacant
Super lightweight	(China) Le-Quan Wang	(England) Prince Patel	vacant	vacant	(Russia) Idris Adalaev	vacant
Lightweight	(Uzbekistan) Siro Choi	not inaugurated	vacant	(England) Raza Hamza	vacant	(South Korea) Bo-Mi-Re Shin
Super featherweight	(Philippines) Lito Badenas	not inaugurated	vacant	(Indonesia) Ruben Manakane	vacant	vacant
Featherweight	(Russia) Mikhail Varlamov	(Mexico) Eduardo Baez	vacant	(Malaysia) Hazman Iskandar Zulkifli Siew	vacant	(Australia) Skye Falzon
Super bantamweight	(China) De-Kang Wang	(South Korea) Kim Ye-joon	vacant	vacant	(Kazakhstan) Kanat Sanggil	vacant
Bantamweight	(Kazakhstan) Yelshat Nikhemttolla	not inaugurated	vacant	vacant	vacant	vacant
Super flyweight	(Japan) Ayumu Sano	not inaugurated	vacant	(Indonesia) Surya Dharma	vacant	(Indonesia) Felmy Sumaehe
Flyweight	vacant	not inaugurated	vacant	vacant	vacant	(Australia) Lekaysha Woodbridge
Light flyweight	vacant	not inaugurated	vacant	Vacant	vacant	vacant
Minimumweight	(Russia) Edmond Khudoyan	not inaugurated	vacant	vacant	vacant	(South Korea) Ye Kyeng-Seo

== Member countries ==
- Bangladesh
- Cambodia
- China
- India
- Indonesia
- Japan
- Kazakhstan
- Korea
- Kyrgyzstan
- Malaysia
- Mongolia
- Pakistan
- Philippines
- Russia
- Singapore
- Taiwan
- Thailand
- United Arab Emirates
- Uzbekistan
- Vietnam

== Affiliated organizations ==
- Bangladesh Professional Boxing Association
- Cambodia Professional Boxing Commission
- China Professional Boxing Association
- China - Each Provincial Commission
- Indian Professional Boxing Association (IPBA)
- Indonesia Professional Boxing Commission
- Indonesia - Uni Combat Council
- Japan Boxing Commission
- Kazakhstan Professional Boxing Federation
- Korea Boxing Commission
- Korea Boxing Federation
- Korea Boxing Members Commission
- Kyrgyz Boxing Commission
- Sport Committee of Malaysia
- Mongolia Boxing Commission
- Pakistan Boxing Commission
- Philippines Game and Amusements Board
- Russia Boxing Federation
- Professional Boxing Federation of Singapore
- Singapore Boxing Federation
- Chinese Taipei Professional Boxing Association
- Thailand Boxing Commission
- Dubai Boxing Commission
- Federation of Professional Boxing of Uzbekistan
- Vietnam Boxing Commission

== See also ==
- List of boxing organisations
