= IPBA =

IPBA may refer to:

- Inter-Pacific Bar Association
- Indian Professional Boxing Association
