= Boxing in India =

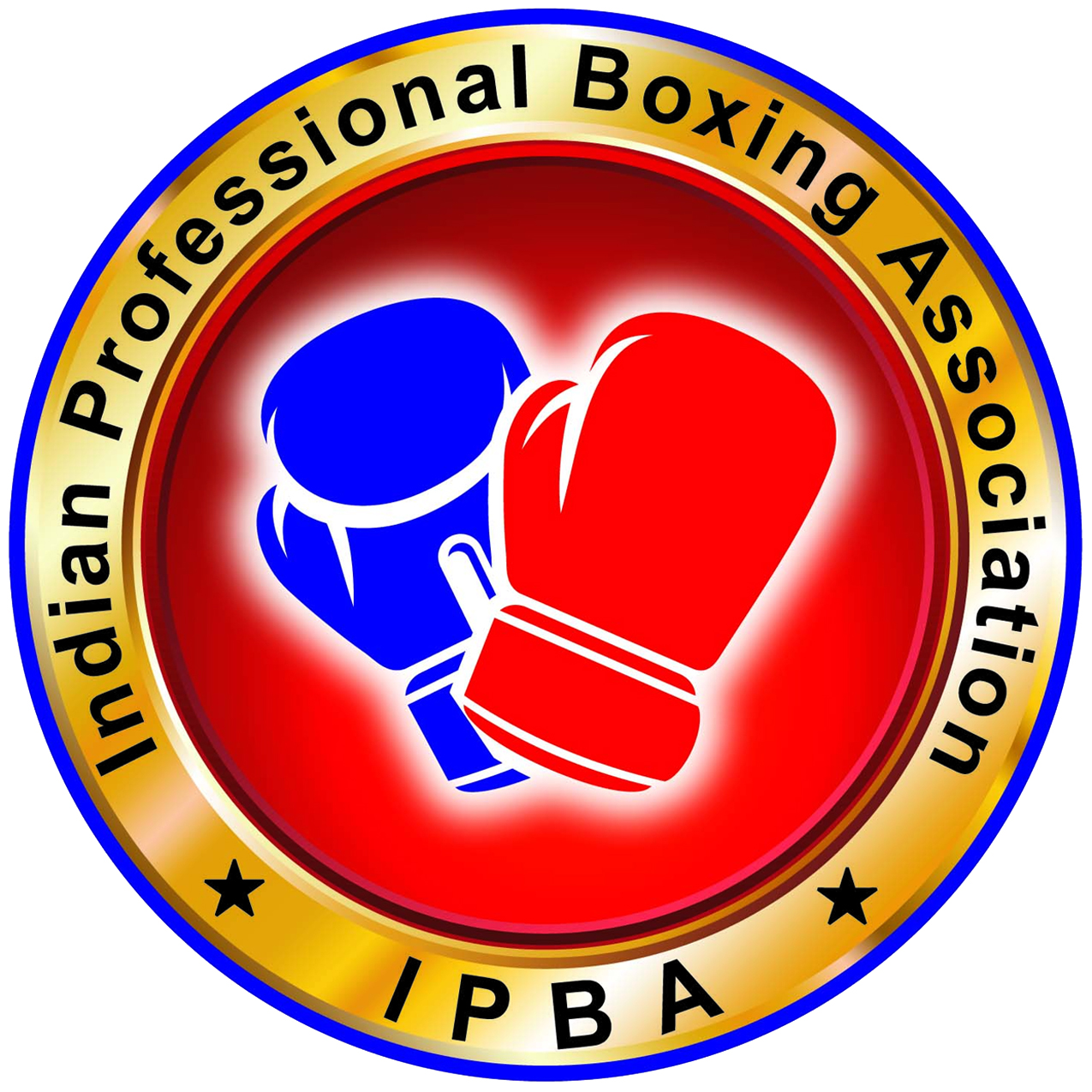
- Country: India
- Governing body: Boxing Federation of India and Indian Professional Boxing Association
- National team: India

In India, the sport of boxing is governed by the Boxing Federation of India for amateur boxing and the Indian Professional Boxing Association for professional boxing. The majority of boxing in India occurs nationally and internationally as amateur boxing, with only a few boxers opting to pursue professional boxing. This has been attributed to a lack of promotional companies, facilities, and revenue.

However, India is a regular medal-holder at international tournaments including the Asian Games, Commonwealth Games and Olympics. Boxing has been rising in popularity in certain states, particularly in Haryana. The Bhiwani Boxing Club in Bhiwani, Haryana has produced medalists in various weight classes.

== Notable performances ==
Mary Kom is a six-time World Amateur Boxing champion, and the only woman boxer to have won a medal in each of the six world championships. She also became the first Indian woman boxer to win a Gold Medal at the Asian Games during the 2014 Asian Games in Incheon, South Korea.

At the 2008 Beijing Olympics, Vijender Singh won a bronze medal in the middleweight boxing category, while Akhil Kumar and Jitender Kumar qualified for the quarterfinals. Akhil Kumar, Jitender Kumar, A.L. Lakra, and Dinesh Kumar each won a bronze medal at the 2008 World Championship.

Vijender Singh briefly reached World No.1 in the middleweight (75 kg) category in 2009, when the International Amateur Boxing Association (AIBA) list was updated after the 2009 AIBA World Boxing Championships held in Milan, where he won India's first medal in an AIBA-WBC. On 29th June 2015, Vijender Singh bid adieu to his amateur career by turning professional as he signed a multi-year agreement with Queensberry Promotions through the Indian company IOS Sports and Entertainment. This ruled him out of the 2016 Olympics as he was no longer eligible to represent India.

== Medal table ==
| Competition | Gold | Silver | Bronze | Total |
|---|---|---|---|---|
| Olympic Games | 0 | 0 | 3 | 3 |
| World Boxing Championships | 14 | 9 | 30 | 53 |
| Asian Games | 9 | 17 | 35 | 61 |
| Commonwealth Games | 11 | 13 | 20 | 44 |
| Asian Championships | 30 | 46 | 68 | 144 |
| Total | 64 | 85 | 156 | 305 |

- updated till 5th August, 2024

== Notable Olympics performances ==
| Year | Event | Player | Result |
|---|---|---|---|
2000
| 2000 | Light heavyweight | Gurcharan Singh | Quarter-finals |
2008
| 2008 | Middleweight | Vijender Singh | 3rd place, bronze medalist(s) |
| 2008 | Flyweight | Jitender Kumar | Quarter-finals |
| 2008 | Bantamweight | Akhil Kumar | Quarter-finals |
2012
| 2012 | Women's flyweight | Mary Kom | 3rd place, bronze medalist(s) |
| 2012 | Men's light flyweight | Devendro Singh | Quarter-finals |
| 2012 | Men's middleweight | Vijender Singh | Quarter-finals |
2016
| 2016 | Men's middleweight | Vikas Krishan Yadav | Quarter-finals |
2020
| 2020 | Women's welterweight | Lovlina Borgohain | 3rd place, bronze medalist(s) |
| 2020 | Women's middleweight | Pooja Rani | Quarter-finals |
| 2020 | Men's super heavyweight | Satish Kumar | Quarter-finals |
2024
| 2024 | Men's 71 kg | Nishant Dev | Quarter-finals |
| 2024 | Women's 75 kg | Lovlina Borgohain | Quarter-finals |

== In popular culture ==
In 2014, Priyanka Chopra portrayed Mary Kom in an award winning biographical film about her life.

== See also ==
- List of National Sports Award recipients in boxing
- Indian Professional Boxing Association
- Boxing Federation of India
