= Shakur Stevenson =

American boxer (born 1997)

- Stevenson in 2023

Personal information
- Born: Ash-Shakur Nafi-Shahid Stevenson; June 28, 1997 (age 29) Newark, New Jersey, U.S.
- Height: 5 ft 8 in (173 cm)
- Weight: Featherweight; Super featherweight; Lightweight; Light welterweight

Boxing career
- Reach: 68 in (173 cm)
- Stance: Southpaw

Boxing record
- Total fights: 25
- Wins: 25
- Win by KO: 11
- Losses: 0
- Draws: 0
Medal record
Men's amateur boxing
Representing United States
Olympic Games
Silver medal – second place	2016 Rio de Janeiro	Bantamweight
Youth Olympic Games
Gold medal – first place	2014 Nanjing	Flyweight
Youth World Championships
Gold medal – first place	2014 Sofia	Flyweight
Junior World Championships
Gold medal – first place	2013 Kyiv	Junior bantamweight

Ash-Shakur Nafi-Shahid Stevenson (born June 28, 1997) is an American professional boxer. He has won world championships in four weight classes, from featherweight to junior welterweight. He has held the World Boxing Organization (WBO) and Ring magazine junior welterweight titles since 2026. As an amateur, he represented the United States at the 2016 Summer Olympics, winning the bantamweight silver medal.

In October 2019, Stevenson won his first major world title by defeating Joet Gonzalez for the vacant WBO featherweight title. Two years later, he captured the WBO super featherweight title, later unifying it with the WBC and The Ring super featherweight titles by defeating Óscar Valdez. In November 2023, Stevenson won the vacant WBC lightweight title to become the eighth boxer in history to be a three-division champion while also winning an Olympic medal. (Note: Joined Sugar Ray Leonard, Pernell Whitaker, Roy Jones Jr., Oscar De La Hoya, Floyd Mayweather Jr., Vasiliy Lomachenko, and Claressa Shields) In January 2026, he moved up to junior welterweight and defeated Teofimo Lopez by unanimous decision to capture the WBO and Ring magazine junior welterweight titles, becoming a four-division world champion.

== Early life ==
Stevenson was born and raised in Newark, New Jersey. He was named after rapper Tupac Shakur, who was murdered nine months before Stevenson was born. Stevenson began boxing at age five under the guidance of his grandfather, Wali Moses, who ran a boxing gym in the city. Growing up, his favorite boxer was Andre Ward.

== Amateur career ==
Stevenson enjoyed a highly successful amateur career, earning recognition as the AIBA Junior Male Boxer of the Year in 2013. At the national level, he won gold medals at the 2013 Junior World Team Open, the 2013 Junior Olympic National Championships, the 2014 Youth National Championships, and the 2015 Youth National Championships.

At the international level, Stevenson won the 2013 AIBA Junior World Championships, the 2014 AIBA Youth World Championships, and the 2014 Summer Youth Olympics, becoming the first American male boxer to claim both junior and youth world titles as well as a Youth Olympic gold medal. In 2015, aged 18, he won the senior U.S. Olympic trials, thus qualifying for the U.S. boxing team at the 2016 Summer Olympics in Rio de Janeiro, Brazil. Entering the Olympics, Stevenson had an undefeated record of 23–0 at the international level. Competing at bantamweight, he won a silver medal, losing to Robeisy Ramírez of Cuba by split decision in the gold medal match. He was the highest-medaling male boxer for the United States at the Olympic Games since Andre Ward won gold in 2004.

== Professional career ==
=== Featherweight ===
==== Early career ====
Stevenson turned professional on February 9, 2017, signing a promotional contract with Top Rank. He signed Andre Ward as his manager.

Promoter Bob Arum told Ringtv that Stevenson would likely make his debut on a stacked card at the StubHub Center in Carson, California on April 22, 2017. Stevenson showed off his agility, defense and punching skills as he won his first professional fight against American boxer Edgar Brito. Stevenson won via fifth round technical decision. Brito was cut on the left eye after an accidental headbutt in round 2. In round 3, he was deducted a point for intentionally headbutting Stevenson. From his own intentional headbutts, Brito suffered a cut over his right eye. The ringside physician stopped the bout. Stevenson was ahead on all three judges scorecards and won every round.

In an official press release on May 3, it was confirmed that Stevenson would make his Madison Square Garden debut on undercard of the Terence Crawford vs. Félix Díaz on May 20, 2017. His opponent was announced as Argentine boxer Carlos Suarez (6–3–2, 1 KO). Stevenson won the bout after 2 minutes and 35 seconds of the first round. Suarez was knocked down before the stoppage. Stevenson's third bout took place at the Pinnacle Bank Arena in Lincoln, Nebraska, again on the undercard of Terence Crawford, this time his unification fight against Julius Indongo on August 19, 2017. Stevenson fought his second straight Argentine opponent, David Michel Paz (4–3) in a scheduled six-round fight. Stevenson easily outpointed Paz over 6 rounds winning 60–53 on all three scorecards. In round 5, Paz was knocked down following a straight left. Stevenson seemed comfortable and patient in letting the fight go the distance. On November 20, Top Rank confirmed 26-year-old Mexican Oscar Mendoza (4–2, 2 KOs) as Stevenson's opponent, which would take place on the undercard of Vasiliy Lomachenko vs. Guillermo Rigondeaux on December 9, 2017, at the Madison Square Garden Theater in New York City, New York.

Stevenson's first fight for 2018 was announced on February 7 to take place at the Grand Sierra Resort and Casino's Grand Theater in Reno, Nevada on February 16 against Juan Tapia (8–1, 3 KOs) in a scheduled 8 round bout. Stevenson easily outpointed Tapia, winning 80–72 on all three judges' scorecards. Stevenson showed defensive improvements in the fight, boxed with his jab and worked to the body. He used the distance well, allowing Tapia to land only one punch at a time.

==== Stevenson vs. Gonzalez ====
In August 2019, The WBO Championship Committee ordered Stevenson and Joet Gonzalez (23–0, 14 KOs) to fight for the vacant WBO featherweight title. The title was previously held by Óscar Valdez. The teams were given 30 days to negotiate and reach an agreement. It took the full 30 days but eventually Top Rank and Golden Boy Promotions, who promote Gonzalez, reached an agreement as reported by ESPN. The agreed date was October 26 and the event was to take place at the Reno-Sparks Convention Center in Reno, Nevada. The fight was broadcast by ESPN+. There was real hatred from Gonzalez as at the time his younger sister was dating Stevenson.

The trash talk continued through to the weigh in. Stevenson weighed 126 pounds and Gonzalez stepped on the scales a little lighter at 125¼ pounds. On the night, in front of 2,828 fans, Stevenson outboxed Gonzalez, winning a unanimous decision with all three judges scoring the bout 119–109 in his favor. After the final bell, Stevenson attempted to reconcile with Gonzalez without success, saying, "I told him he's a helluva fighter. He didn't really want to talk to me, but it is what it is." He began to call for a unification fight with IBF champion Josh Warrington. Stevenson became the first 2016 Rio Olympics Team USA male fighter to win a world title. On July 9, 2020, Stevenson vacated his WBO title without making a single title defense, as he had moved up to the super featherweight division.

=== Super featherweight ===
On June 9, 2020 Stevenson made his super featherweight debut by defeating Felix Caraballo via 6th round KO. The fight took place in Las Vegas. Caraballo was dropped in the opening round and again in round 6. The judges had Stevenson ahead 50–43, 50–44 and 50–44 at the time of stoppage. The fight drew a peak audience of 609,000 viewers.

==== Stevenson vs. Clary ====
In November 2020, Top Rank announced Stevenson would fight Toka Khan Clary (28–2, 19 KOs) on December 12 in a 10-round bout at The Bubble at the MGM Grand Hotel & Casino in Las Vegas. Stevenson originally came in over the limit at 130 ½ pounds, then stripped down and weighed 130 pounds. Kahn Clary weighed 129 pounds. Kahn Clary was on a three-fight win streak heading into the fight. Stevenson defeated Clary convincingly, winning the fight by a wide margin on the scorecards, with all three judges scoring the contest 100–90 in his favor. Stevenson landed 151 punches from the 514 thrown for a 29% connect rate. Kahn Clary only managed to land 48 of the 529 punches thrown for a very low 9% connect rate. The fight averaged 1,281,000 viewers.

==== Stevenson vs. Nakathila ====
After improving to 15–0, in April 2021, it was announced that Stevenson would next fight Jeremiah Nakathila (21–1, 17 KOs) on June 12, 2021, at The Theater at Virgin Hotels in Las Vegas. Nakathila was ranked #2 by the WBO at super featherweight. Stevenson stepped on the scales at 129.6 pounds and Nakathila officially weighed 129.4 pounds.

Stevenson knocked down Nakathila with a check hook in the fourth round of their fight, en route to a shutout unanimous decision victory to win the vacant WBO interim junior lightweight title. The bout attracted criticism from pundits and analysts, citing the low number of punches thrown by Stevenson leading to a lack of action. So few meaningful punches were thrown that the ESPN commentators Joe Tessitore, Tim Bradley and Andre Ward who were calling the fight criticized Stevenson during the live broadcast of the fight. Stevenson also admitted he did not like his performance and tried to get the stoppage. He then said he was being cautious in the fight due to Nakathila's power. The fight drew an average audience of 857,000 and peaked at 927,000.

==== Stevenson vs. Herring ====
In September 2021, it was announced that Stevenson would challenge Jamel Herring (23–2, 11 KOs) for the full WBO junior lightweight champion on October 23 at the State Farm Arena in Atlanta, Georgia. The fight would headline a three-bout broadcast by ESPN. Herring was coming off a career-best win earlier in the year, stopping former world champion Carl Frampton to retain his world title. Due to Stevenson holding the interim belt, Herring had to make a choice of either fighting him next or vacating. Oscar Valdez made it clear he wanted the winner of this bout next. Bob Arum who promoted all three boxers at the time also made it clear he would make the fight next. At the weight-in, a stone faced Herring weighed 129.8 pounds, and Stevenson came in at the 130 pound limit. Despite being the champion going into the fight, Herring was the underdog, however brushed it off saying, “Look at all my big fights. I was an underdog against Ito, Frampton, this one. So, it doesn’t mean much to me."

In a one-sided performance that saw Stevenson use remarkable hand speed, he became a two-division world champion when he defeated Herring via tenth-round technical knockout after being ahead on all three judges' scorecards. In the aftermath of his victory, Stevenson proclaimed, "I want to be a superstar in the sport; I'm here to last.". The fight was waived off with 1 minute and 30 seconds remaining. Stevenson out landed Herring 164–87 in total punches and out landed him in all rounds. At the time of stoppage, two judges had the fight 90–81 and the third had it 89–82 all for Stevenson. Herring suffered his first defeat in four years and claimed Stevenson was the better man and he had no excuses. According to Nielsen Media Research, the fight averaged 1,233,000 viewers and peaked at 1,264,000 viewers. These figures did not include viewers who tuned in on ESPN+ and ESPN Deportes.

==== Stevenson vs. Valdez ====
On January 16, 2022, there were negotiations that Stevenson would have a unification bout with WBC champion Óscar Valdez (17–0, 9 KOs). 3 days later, the fight was confirmed for April 30 at the MGM Grand Garden Arena, Paradise, Nevada and officially announced on February 17. The fight was to be part of a tripleheader. Stevenson felt it would make him a pay-per-view star. For the contest, PED test was heavily emphasised. Throughout the build up, Stevenson used the word "cheating". This was a dig at Valdez, who claimed he innocently ingested stimulants and not a PED. Stevenson weighed at the 130 pound limit and Valdez came in at 129.6 pounds.

Stevenson dominated using his jab and footwork to outland and outwork Valdez, even scoring a knockdown in round 6. Valdez was not competitive and had no answer for Stevenson’s defensive skills, reflexes, and more importantly his size, which was a big disadvantage for him. In the final round, Shakur looked to play it safe, using movement rather than going for the kill and finishing strong. Stevenson won by unanimous decision with scores of 117–110, 118–109 and 118–110. In doing so, Stevenson unified the WBC and vacant The Ring super featherweight titles with his WBO belt. According to CompuBox stats, Stevenson landed 189 of his 580 punches thrown with a connect rate of 32.6%, while Valdez had a connect rate of 21.7% which saw him land 110 of his 508 thrown.

In the post fight interview, Stevenson said he had beat the Canelo team and opened up a potential fight with WBC lightweight champion Devin Haney. Stevenson then proposed to his girlfriend in the ring. The fight drew in an average of 1,353,000 viewers on ESPN and peaked at 1,440,000.

==== Stevenson vs. Conceição ====
Stevenson's first championship defense as a unified super featherweight titlist was scheduled against the one-time WBC title challenger Robson Conceição. The fight headlined an ESPN broadcast card, which took place on September 23, 2022, at the Prudential Center in Newark, New Jersey. He entered the bout as a significant favorite, with most bookmakers having him at –1800 odds to win the fight. Stevenson missed weight by 1.6 lbs at the official weigh-ins leading to him being stripped of his WBC, WBO, and Ring titles. Prior to the fight, Stevenson stated he was unsure if he was going to stay at the weight. Stevenson saw the fight stylistically tougher than his previous fight against Valdez.

In front of an audience of 10,107, Stevenson won the fight by unanimous decision, with two scorecards of 117–109 and one scorecard of 118–108. In the first round several times Stevenson stunned Conceição with a left on the chin with little landing otherwise from either boxer. In the second round Conceição seemed to have a problem connecting with his punches as Stevenson countered him. Stevenson was warned twice for low blows by Referee David Fields in round 3. In the final seconds of the fourth round, a left hand from Stevenson to the body dropped Conceição for an 8-count from referee Fields as the bell sounded. Stevenson continued to control the fight and was deducted a point in the ninth round for tossing Conceição to the canvas. Stevenson flipped Conceição to the canvas again in round 10, this time only a warning was given. Conceição had trouble landing flush throughout the fight. The belts remained vacant.

During the post fight interview, Stevenson announced his move to lightweight, citing his inability to make the junior lightweight limit. The fight drew a peak audience of 1,150,000 and averaged 1,097,000 viewers.

=== Lightweight ===
==== Stevenson vs. Yoshino ====
On November 9, 2022, the WBC ordered Isaac Cruz to face Stevenson in a lightweight title eliminator. As Cruz refused to enter into negotiations, the WBC ordered William Zepeda to face Stevenson instead, as the next highest ranked contender. Zepeda likewise passed on the fight, as did the former unified lightweight champion George Kambosos Jr. The order was finally accepted by Shuichiro Yoshino on January 11, 2023. It would mark the first time Yoshino would fight outside of Japan professionally. Stevenson was booked to face Yoshino on April 8, 2023, at the Prudential Center in Newark, New Jersey. Stevenson won the fight via sixth-round technical knockout. Stevenson landed 50% of his total punches (123 of 245) and 60% of his power shots (104 of 174), while Yoshino was only able to land a total of 36 total punches. The win earned him a shot at the WBC lightweight title. Stevenson used his jab and right hook to keep Yoshino at bay, while also mixing up his attack with body shots and uppercuts. Stevenson dominated the fight with his speed, accuracy and ring IQ, dropping Yoshino twice and landing at will until the referee intervened. According to Stevenson, the referee should not have stopped the fight, a he wanted to apply more punishment to Yoshino, who disagreed with the stoppage and played down Stevenson's power.

==== Stevenson vs. De Los Santos ====
On August 26, 2023, the WBC ordered Frank Martin to face the former two-weight world champion Stevenson for the vacant lightweight title. As Martin later withdrew from the negotiations, Stevenson was instead ordered to face Edwin De Los Santos. The championship bout took place on November 16, 2023, at the T-Mobile Arena in Paradise, Nevada. De Los Santos claimed himself to be the real boogeyman of the division. Stevenson weighed 133.8 pounds and De Los Santos checked in at 134.3 pounds. Stevenson promised a dominant performance.

In a very uninspiring fight with practically no action for 12 rounds, Stevenson walked away with a unanimous decision victory, with scores of 115–113, 116–112, and 116–112 and became a three-weight world champion. In the opening two rounds, little happened as Stevenson landed more jabs than De Los Santos. The fans began to call for some action in round 3. The entire round, De Los Santos fought without a mouthpiece. In the fourth round what little punches connected came from Stevenson, all jabs. Any rounds which De Los Santos won, was due to landing a few more jabs than Stevenson. By round 9, there was speculation of Stevenson’s left hand being injured due to the volume of punches which were being thrown. Although referee Harvey Dock had little do to, what he failed to do was call for some action from the boxers. According to CompuBox, Stevenson landed a total of 65 out of 205 punches and De Los Santos landed 40 of his 316 thrown, the latter setting a record for the least amount of punches landed by a fighter in a twelve-round contest. Furthermore, neither fighter landed a double-digit number of strikes in any round, with the highest being nine punches by Shakur Stevenson in the ninth round, the only round where more than six punches were landed by either fighter. For comparison, the most punches landed by De Los Santos in a round were six punches in the tenth. The 40 punches landed in the fight was a CompuBox record for only a month, as Prograis landed only 36 over 12 rounds in a decision loss to Devin Haney. Stevenson later apologised to fans at ringside. He said, “Yo, that’s dope. I got Floyd to come to a Top Rank fight. He came here to support me. I appreciate Floyd. I apologized to him, I apologized to Andre Ward, I apologized to Terence Crawford, all my idols. I put on a bad performance. They came out to see a great performance and I put on a bad one." Most of the 6,703 fans in attendance also booed the fight.

In January 2024, Stevenson took to X and briefly announced his retirement from boxing at the age of 26.

==== Stevenson vs. Harutyunyan ====
Stevenson made his first defense of his WBC lightweight title against Artem Harutyunyan at Prudential Center in Newark, New Jersey on July 6, 2024. The fight would mark the Stevenson's last bout under Top Rank as his contract was due to expire, having turned pro with them a year after the Olympics. Going into the bout, Harutyunyan had not fought in over a year. He was last defeated by Frank Martin via unanimous decision in Las Vegas in July 2023. The fight would also mark Harutyunyan's second professional fight outside of Germany. He won the fight by unanimous decision. The three judges scorecards read 119–109, 118–110, 116–112. The fight began slowly, with Stevenson taking over and using a careful punch selection, cruised to a win. Speaking after the fight in the defence of his lacklustre performance, Stevenson said, “It’s kind of hard to prove [you’re that guy] when you don’t have a fighter who’s trying to fight back. I’ve got to cut off the ring a little bit more." Stevenson landed 170 punches compared to 74 landed by Harutyunyan.

==== Signing with Matchroom Boxing ====
Stevenson turned down a $15 million five-fight deal with his existing promoter Top Rank and thus became a free agent. After talks with Oscar De La Hoya and Floyd Mayweather Jr., in August 2024, he signed a promotional deal with Eddie Hearn's Matchroom Boxing. It was also announced that he would fight Joe Cordina on the undercard of Artur Beterbiev vs. Dmitry Bivol in October 2024. Stevenson said on his new promotional deal, "I've made it clear that I want the biggest names and the biggest fights in the sport. Bring on [WBC lightweight mandatory challenger] William Zepeda at the top of 2025 and I'm ready for anyone who is brave enough to step in the ring with me. There have been few willing to take on that challenge in recent years. With Matchroom and Riyadh Season, I am teaming up with a promotional force that matches my world-class talent. We will be unstoppable in and out of the ring, and I will continue to show my dominance for many years to come in the sport of boxing."

Stevenson was scheduled to make the second defense of his title against Joe Cordina at Kingdom Arena in Riyadh, Saudi Arabia, on October 12, 2024. On September 11, 2024 it was announced that Stevenson suffered hand injury and the fight was cancelled.

In November 2024, Wiliam Zepeda defeated Tevin Farmer to stay on course to challenge Stevenson. A date in February 2025 was likely. A week after the fight, Zepeda's head coach Jacob "Panda" Najar told the media the proposed fight between Stevenson and Zepeda in Saudi in February 2025 was in jeopardy after Zepeda suffered an injury to his left arm. Undefeated lightweight contender Floyd Schofield (18–0, 12 KOs) then made himself available and took to social media to plead to his promoter Oscar De La Hoya to make the fight. Eddie Hearn later confirmed that an offer had been made to Schofield to challenge Stevenson, although Stevenson wanted Schofield to fight Abdullah Mason before challenging him. Stevenson felt his name was just being used to promote themselves. On December 2, Hearn stated, "We're talking to Golden Boy as well. We've made them an offer, when Shakur was supposed to be fighting Zepeda. All was good for February 22; now they're saying that Zepeda is not ready. [Stevenson] needs an opponent. For me, Schofield has been calling out for a while now." At that moment, no one was being ruled out. On December 2, Riyadh Season announced a blockbuster card to take place at the Kingdom Arena in Riyadh, Saudi Arabia where Stevenson vs. Schofield was made official for the WBC lightweight title. The card was scheduled to take place on February 22, 2025.

Speaking at the Ring Magazine awards ceremony on January 11, 2025, Stevenson stated he knew what it felt like being in Schofield's position being young and hungry for a world title and wanting to win. Stevenson however said he was too smart and had more experience and this would be his key to winning.

==== Stevenson vs. Padley ====
During fight week, Schofield failed to attend the ceremonial grand arrivals. His trainer and father posted a tweet on X, which read: “They poisoned my son", claiming a masseuse had wiped a cream on his body, This post was deleted, but received a response from Stevenson's co-manager Josh Dubin, who threatened legal consequences for defamation. Schofield previously did not attend the press conference in London, in January. It was later reported that the BBBofC had pulled Schofield from the card due to illness. Stevenson was still scheduled to appear with Moussa Gholam (22–1, 13 KOs) and WBC #12 lightweight Josh Padley (15–0, 4 KOs) as potential replacements. A picture was posted on social media showing Schofield hospitalized. Padley, who was coming off a career best win in September 2024 over Mark Chamberlain, was confirmed as Stevenson's opponent. Schofield revealed he had been tested by VADA following his removal from the card. This was done at his own request, as he was out to prove that he had been poisoned. Stevenson stated he was unbothered about the replacement and still up for putting on a performance.

Stevenson scored a ninth-round TKO to retain his world title. Padley put in a courageous effort, but was dropped three times in the ninth round from body shots before his corner threw in the towel. Padley tried to inflict damage on Stevenson, but didn’t possess the power, size, or hand speed, to cause any trouble for Stevenson. At times, he looked overwhelmed, as it was a big step up in class. Stevenson went on to call out WBA champion Gervonta Davis for a unification bout. Padley was able to quit his day job as an electrician and focus on boxing after a career changing six-figure purse, which was reported to be between £300,000 to £500,000. He was praised by Stevenson for stepping in and later rewarded with a multi-fight promotional deal with Eddie Hearn's Matchroom Boxing.

==== Stevenson vs. Zepeda ====
In April 2025, potential talks resumed between the teams of Stevenson and Zepeda (33–0, 27 KOs). Oscar De La Hoya stated he wanted the fight to take place in the Summer. Stevenson’s co-manager Josh Dubin also stated this was the next fight to make for both boxers. De La Hoya accused Stevenson of pulling out of the fight. Stevenson retaliated by stating the money he was originally offered for the fight by Turki Alalshikh, has now been lowered. Stevenson was still open to negotiating the fight. On April 8, the WBC formally ordered the fight. It was reported that Stevenson’s team requested a 70/30 split in his favor, with Golden Boy negotiating a more fair 55/45 split.

On April 20, The Ring announced a doubleheader to take place in New York City on July 12, which would see Stevenson defend his WBC title against Zepeda. The card was to be televised exclusively on DAZN and launch The Ring's new TV show, "Inside The Ring." After the fight was announced, Dan Rafael reported that Stevenson was working with veteran promoter Lou DiBella, who helped put the fight together. It was said that Matchroom Boxing did not contact Stevenson after the Padley fight to explore a second fight in the signed two-fight deal which was signed. Stevenson was able to negotiation with Turki Alalshikh directly. Hearn strongly denied these rumours, stating Stevenson's next bout with Zepeda would be under Matchroom, with further negotiations to take place after the fight to see the direction all parties would want to take. On May 15, Ring Magazine announced the card would take place at the Louis Armstrong Stadium, located in USTA Billie Jean King National Tennis Center in the Flushing Meadows-Corona Park in Queens. This would mark the first time the stadium would host a boxing event. During the weigh-in, Stevenson successfully hit the 135-pound limit, while Zepeda registered a weight of 134.6 pounds.

On the night, Stevenson stood firm in the ring, showcasing an impressive display of skill and strategy to successfully defend his title with a unanimous decision victory. Engaging in a toe-to-toe battle, he allowed Zepeda to throw a flurry of punches, absorbing most on his arms and shoulders. Rather than retreating, Stevenson employed effective jabs to the body, uppercuts, and fluid combinations to pressure Zepeda. While Zepeda did land a significant right hand in the third round that seemed to shake Stevenson, it was one of the few notable moments in the fight. Despite Zepeda's relentless aggression and high punch output, Stevenson found ample opportunities to counter and respond. As the match progressed into the later rounds, Zepeda's pace began to wane, enabling Stevenson to take control with hooks targeting both the head and body. Although Zepeda was never seriously hurt, he fell behind against the precision of Stevenson, who clearly outperformed him throughout the bout. Two judges scored the fight 118–110 and one judge had it 119–109, all for Stevenson. According to CompuBox, Stevenson landed 295 of 565 punches thrown (52.5%) and Zepeda landed 272 of his 979 thrown (27.8%). 199 of Stevenson's punches landed were power shots.

Stevenson's performance was met with praise by the commentary team and boxing pundits. After the fight, he said, “I came here to prove a point. I took more punishment than usual. … I got that dog in me. At the end of the day, I told you all, whatever it takes to get the job done. I got dog in me. I'm not a puppy, I'm not a poodle, I'm a tough guy, so I got dog in me." Stevenson was one of few boxers who were being watched closely following Turki Alalshikh's comments in May on there being no more "Tom & Jerry" fights.

=== Super lightweight ===
==== Stevenson vs. Lopez ====
On September 1, 2025, it was reported that Stevenson had agreed terms to move up in weight and challenge WBO super lightweight champion Teofimo Lopez (22–1,13 KOs) in January 2026. Both boxers had actively engaged on social media and shown interest in the fight. The fight was expected to be part of a Premier Boxing Champions card and backed by Turki Alalshikh. Both expressed excitement for the matchup during the Crawford-Álvarez fight in Las Vegas. Stevenson was aiming to capture a fourth division title. While the Barclays Center in Brooklyn was the likely venue for the bout, it was stated that Stevenson’s camp preferred Madison Square Garden to avoid Lopez's hometown advantage. On November 5, it was reported that negotiations were advancing positively regarding the fight. A potential date was identified as January 31, which would strategically place the event between the NFL conference championship games and the Super Bowl, potentially increasing its visibility and viewership. On December 1, the fight was announced to take place on January 31 in New York, as part of "The Ring VI," exclusively on DAZN. The fight would see Lopez defending his WBO and Ring Magazine junior welterweight title. Stevenson was aiming to become a four-division champion. On December 9, Madison Square Garden was confirmed as the venue. Stevenson admitted that their styles may pose difficulties for one another, and stated that execution will be crucial on fight night. He said, “He’s not going to win coming forward. He’s going to try and sit back and bring me to him. That style is something he is going to try to make me do. I do the same thing. So we are kind of similar in style." Stevenson was a heavy –350 favourite while Lopez was entering as a +250 underdog. According to Lopez, there was no rematch clause in the contract.

==== Zuffa Boxing ====
On July 9, 2026, it was announced that Stevenson had signed with Zuffa Boxing. Stevenson said, "With Zuffa Boxing, I’m going to go after the biggest fights in the sport and I will become the number one pound-for-pound fighter in the world." Dana White regarded Stevenson as, "one of the best pound-for-pound fighters in the world." The move prompted debate over whether Zuffa’s promotional model could complicate potential bouts with fighters such as Gervonta Davis and Devin Haney, although Stevenson stated that his intention was to secure the biggest available matchups. However, on October 19, 2026, Stevenson announced on his YouTube channel that he asked to be released from Zuffa. His request was honored and was released without ever fighting for Zuffa.

== Personal life ==
Stevenson is the son of Malikah Stevenson and is the eldest of nine siblings. His father, Alfredo Rivera, was not involved in raising him. His father died of a heart attack on September 29, 2019. He is engaged to Lyric Ragston, a rapper and singer who performs under the name "Young Lyric". Their first child, a daughter, was born in December 2021.

According to a police report, Stevenson and fellow boxer David Grayton were involved in an altercation in a South Beach parking garage. The two fighters made comments to a group of people in a parking garage. Stevenson was arrested on July 1, 2018, and charged with misdemeanor battery. On June 18, 2019, Stevenson agreed to a deal where the charges would be dropped after one year of probation and 50 hours of community service. He had already paid the victims' medical expenses.

== Professional boxing record ==
25 fights	25 wins	0 losses
By knockout	11	0
By decision	14	0

No.	Result	Record	Opponent	Type	Round, time	Date	Location	Notes
25	Win	25–0	Teofimo Lopez	UD	12	Jan 31, 2026	Madison Square Garden, New York City, New York, U.S.	Won WBO and The Ring junior welterweight titles
24	Win	24–0	William Zepeda	UD	12	Jul 12, 2025	Louis Armstrong Stadium, New York City, New York, U.S.	Retained WBC lightweight title
23	Win	23–0	Josh Padley	TKO	9 (12) 3:00	Feb 22, 2025	The Venue Riyadh Season, Riyadh, Saudi Arabia	Retained WBC lightweight title
22	Win	22–0	Artem Harutyunyan	UD	12	Jul 6, 2024	Prudential Center, Newark, New Jersey, U.S.	Retained WBC lightweight title
21	Win	21–0	Edwin De Los Santos	UD	12	Nov 16, 2023	T-Mobile Arena, Paradise, Nevada, U.S.	Won vacant WBC lightweight title
20	Win	20–0	Shuichiro Yoshino	TKO	6 (12) 1:35	Apr 8, 2023	Prudential Center, Newark, New Jersey, U.S.	
19	Win	19–0	Robson Conceição	UD	12	Sep 23, 2022	Prudential Center, Newark, New Jersey, U.S.	WBC, WBO, and The Ring super featherweight titles at stake only for Conceição as Stevenson missed weight
18	Win	18–0	Óscar Valdez	UD	12	Apr 30, 2022	MGM Grand Garden Arena, Paradise, Nevada, U.S.	Retained WBO super featherweight title; Won WBC and vacant The Ring super featherweight titles
17	Win	17–0	Jamel Herring	TKO	10 (12), 1:30	Oct 23, 2021	State Farm Arena, Atlanta, Georgia, U.S.	Won WBO super featherweight title
16	Win	16–0	Jeremiah Nakathila	UD	12	Jun 12, 2021	Virgin Hotels Las Vegas, Paradise, Nevada, U.S.	Won vacant WBO interim super featherweight title
15	Win	15–0	Toka Khan Clary	UD	10	Dec 12, 2020	MGM Grand Conference Center, Paradise, Nevada, U.S.	
14	Win	14–0	Felix Caraballo	KO	6 (10), 1:31	Jun 9, 2020	MGM Grand Conference Center, Paradise, Nevada, U.S.	
13	Win	13–0	Joet Gonzalez	UD	12	Oct 26, 2019	Sparks Convention Center, Reno, Nevada, U.S.	Won vacant WBO featherweight title
12	Win	12–0	Alberto Guevara	KO	3 (10), 2:37	Jul 13, 2019	Prudential Center, Newark, New Jersey, U.S.	Retained NABO featherweight title
11	Win	11–0	Christopher Diaz	UD	10	Apr 20, 2019	Madison Square Garden, New York City, New York, U.S.	Retained IBF Inter-Continental featherweight title; Won vacant NABO featherweight title
10	Win	10–0	Jessie Cris Rosales	TKO	4 (10), 1:29	Jan 18, 2019	Turning Stone Resort Casino, Verona, New York, U.S.	Won vacant IBF Inter-Continental and WBC Continental Americas featherweight titles
9	Win	9–0	Viorel Simion	TKO	1 (10), 3:00	Oct 13, 2018	CHI Health Center, Omaha, Nebraska, U.S.	
8	Win	8–0	Carlos Ruiz	UD	8	Aug 18, 2018	Ocean Resort Casino, Atlantic City, New Jersey, U.S.	
7	Win	7–0	Aelio Mesquita	TKO	2 (8), 1:45	Jun 9, 2018	MGM Grand Garden Arena, Paradise, Nevada, U.S.	
6	Win	6–0	Roxberg Patrick Riley	TKO	2 (8), 1:35	Apr 28, 2018	Liacouras Center, Philadelphia, Pennsylvania, U.S.	
5	Win	5–0	Juan Tapia	UD	8	Feb 16, 2018	Grand Sierra Resort, Reno, Nevada, U.S.	
4	Win	4–0	Oscar Mendoza	TKO	2 (6), 1:38	Dec 9, 2017	The Theater at Madison Square Garden, New York City, New York, U.S.	
3	Win	3–0	David Michel Paz	UD	6	Aug 19, 2017	Pinnacle Bank Arena, Lincoln, Nebraska, U.S.	
2	Win	2–0	Carlos Gaston Suarez	TKO	1 (6), 2:35	May 20, 2017	Madison Square Garden, New York City, New York, U.S.	
1	Win	1–0	Edgar Brito	TD	6 (6), 3:00	Apr 22, 2017	Stubhub Center, Carson, California, U.S.	Unanimous TD: Brito cut from an accidental head clash

== Titles in boxing ==
=== Major world titles ===
- WBO featherweight champion (126 lbs)
- WBC super featherweight champion (130 lbs)
- WBO super featherweight champion (130 lbs)
- WBC lightweight champion (135 lbs)
- WBO junior welterweight champion (140 lbs)

=== The Ring magazine titles ===
- The Ring super featherweight champion (130 lbs)
- The Ring junior welterweight champion (140 lbs)

=== Interim world titles ===
- WBO interim super featherweight champion (130 lbs)

=== Regional/International titles ===
- WBC Continental Americas featherweight champion (126 lbs)
- IBF Inter-Continental featherweight champion (126 lbs)
- NABO featherweight champion (126 lbs)

== Awards ==
- The Ring magazine Performance of the Year: 2021 vs. Jamel Herring
- AIBA Junior Male Boxer of the Year: 2013
- New Jersey Boxing Hall of Fame – Junior Olympic Boxer of the Year: 2012, 2013
- New Jersey Boxing Hall of Fame – Professional Boxer of the Year: 2019, 2021, 2022
- Pigskin Club of Washington Boxer of the Year: 2016
- U.S. Olympic Trials Outstanding Boxer Award: 2016
- World Series of Boxing Boxer of the Week: 2016

=== Honors ===
- Key to Essex County: January 8, 2020
- In July 2024, Stevenson was awarded permanent recognition at the Prudential Center for his contributions to the city of Newark, New Jersey

== See also ==
- List of world featherweight boxing champions
- List of world super-featherweight boxing champions
- List of world lightweight boxing champions
- List of boxing triple champions

== Notes and references ==
=== References ===
Sporting positions
Regional boxing titles
Vacant Title last held by Kid Galahad	IBF Inter-Continental featherweight champion January 18 – October 26, 2019	Vacant Title next held by Albert Batyrgaziev
Vacant Title last held by Joshue Veraza	WBC Continental Americas featherweight champion January 18 – October 26, 2019; Won WBO title	Vacant Title next held by Eduardo Ramirez
Vacant Title last held by Joet Gonzalez	NABO featherweight champion April 20 – October 26, 2019; Won world title	Vacant Title next held by Pedro Marquez Medina
World boxing titles
Vacant Title last held by Óscar Valdez	WBO featherweight champion October 26, 2019 – July 7, 2020	Vacant Title next held by Emanuel Navarrete
Vacant Title last held by Miguel Berchelt	WBO super featherweight champion Interim title June 12 – October 23, 2021; Won full title	Vacant Title next held by Óscar Valdez
Preceded by Jamel Herring	WBO super featherweight champion October 23, 2021 – September 22, 2022; Stripped	Vacant Title next held by Emanuel Navarrete
Preceded by Óscar Valdez	WBC super featherweight champion April 30 – September 22, 2022; Stripped	Vacant Title next held by O'Shaquie Foster
Vacant Title last held by Manny Pacquiao	The Ring super featherweight champion April 30 – September 22, 2022; Stripped	Vacant Title next held by O'Shaquie Foster
Vacant Title last held by Devin Haney	WBC lightweight champion November 16, 2023 – February 4, 2026; Stripped	Vacant Title next held by William Zepeda
Preceded by Teofimo Lopez	WBO junior welterweight champion January 31, 2026 – present	Incumbent
Preceded by Teofimo Lopez	The Ring junior welterweight champion January 31, 2026 – present	Incumbent
