= Padraig McCrory =

Irish boxer (born 1988)

Personal information
- Nationality: Irish
- Born: 20 June 1988 (age 38) Belfast, Northern Ireland
- Height: 6 ft 1 in (185 cm)
- Weight: Super Middleweight, Light heavyweight

Boxing career
- Stance: Orthodox

Boxing record
- Total fights: 23
- Wins: 20
- Win by KO: 10
- Losses: 3

Padraig McCrory (born 20 June 1988) is an Irish professional boxer.

== Professional career ==
McCrory has competed at Super Middleweight, Light Heavyweight and Cruiserweight in his professional career, capturing the WBC International Silver Super Middleweight and IBO Light Heavyweight titles.

=== 2024 ===
==== McCrory vs Berlanga ====
On 24 February 2024 in Orlando, Florida, undefeated McCrory faced undefeated Edgar Berlanga in a 12-round bout at super middleweight. The result was McCrory's first loss, a technical knockout in round six.

== Professional boxing record ==
23 fights	20 wins	3 losses
By knockout	10	3
By decision	10	0

No.	Result	Record	Opponent	Type	Round, time	Date	Location	Notes
23	Loss	20–3	Imam Khataev	KO	1 (10), 1:09	8 Oct 2026	Capitol De Quebec, Quebec, Canada	
22	Win	20–2	Ondrej Budera	TKO	2 (8), 2:32	26 Jun 2026	Ulster Hall, Belfast, N.Ireland	
21	Loss	19-2	(United Kingdom) Craig Richards	KO	8 (10), 1:58	1 March 2025	(United Kingdom) The SSE Arena, Belfast, Northern Ireland	
20	Win	19–1	(Colombia) Leonard Carrillo	PTS	10	1 November 2024	(United Kingdom) The SSE Arena, Belfast, Northern Ireland	
19	Loss	18–1	(United States) Edgar Berlanga	TKO	6 (12), 2:44	24 February 2024	(United States) Caribe Royale Orlando, Orlando, Florida, U.S.	
18	Win	18–0	(United Kingdom) Steed Woodall	UD	10	4 August 2023	(United Kingdom) Falls Park, Belfast, Northern Ireland	
17	Win	17–0	(Argentina) Diego Ramirez	PTS	10	27 May 2023	(United Kingdom) The SSE Arena, Belfast, Northern Ireland	
16	Win	16–0	(Ukraine) Dmytro Fedas	PTS	8	10 December 2022	(United Kingdom) The SSE Arena, Belfast, Northern Ireland	
15	Win	15–0	(Germany) Leon Bunn	TKO	6 (12), 1:58	22 October 2022	Fabriksporthalle, Frankfurt, Germany	Won vacant IBO Light Heavyweight Title
14	Win	14–0	(Mexico) Marco Antonio Periban	TKO	5 (10), 2:14	6 August 2022	(United Kingdom) The SSE Arena, Belfast, Northern Ireland	Retained WBC International Silver Super Middleweight Title
13	Win	13–0	(Portugal) Celso Neves	TKO	2 (10), 0:35	5 November 2021	(United Kingdom) Ulster Hall, Belfast, Northern Ireland	Retained WBC International Silver Super Middleweight Title
12	Win	12–0	(Russia) Sergei Gorokhov	TKO	5 (10), 1:47	6 August 2021	(United Kingdom) Falls Park, Belfast, Northern Ireland	Won WBC International Silver Super Middleweight Title
11	Win	11–0	(United Kingdom) Mickey Ellison	TKO	1 (8), 1:10	2 September 2020	(United Kingdom) Production Park Studios, South Kirkby, England	
10	Win	10–0	(United Kingdom) Lewis van Poetsch	PTS	6	1 February 2020	(United Kingdom) Ulster Hall, Belfast, Northern Ireland	
9	Win	9–0	(Republic of Ireland) Steve Collins Jr	TKO	8 (8), 1:46	3 August 2019	(United Kingdom) Falls Park, Belfast, Northern Ireland	Won vacant Boxing Union of Ireland BUI Celtic Super Middleweight
8	Win	8–0	(Nigeria) Eric Nwankwo	PTS	6	17 May 2019	(United Kingdom) Ulster Hall, Belfast, Northern Ireland	
7	Win	7–0	(Nicaragua) Santos Medrano	PTS	6	29 March 2019	(United Kingdom) Ulster Hall, Belfast, Northern Ireland	
6	Win	6–0	(Hungary) Gabor Detre	TKO	1 (4), 1:14	7 December 2018	(United Kingdom) Titanic Exhibition Centre, Belfast, Northern Ireland	
5	Win	5–0	(United Kingdom) Sean McGlinchey	PTS	4	5 October 2018	(United Kingdom) Titanic Exhibition Centre, Belfast, Northern Ireland	
4	Win	4–0	(United Kingdom) Harry Matthews	PTS	4	30 June 2018	(United Kingdom) The SSE Arena, Belfast, Northern Ireland	
3	Win	3–0	(Dominican Republic) Manny Bique	TKO	2 (4), 2:55	10 February 2018	(United Kingdom) Devenish Complex, Belfast, Northern Ireland	
2	Win	2–0	(Nicaragua) Michael Mora	TKO	2 (4), 2:18	1 December 2017	(United Kingdom) Devenish Complex, Belfast, Northern Ireland	
1	Win	1–0	(United Kingdom) Jacob Lucas	PTS	4	10 June 2017	(United Kingdom) Odyssey Arena, Belfast, Northern Ireland	
