= Serhat Guler =

Turkish boxer

Personal information
- Nationality: Turkish
- Born: Istanbul, Turkey
- Height: 6 ft (183 cm)
- Weight: Super middleweight

Boxing career
- Stance: Orthodox

Boxing record
- Total fights: 7
- Wins: 7
- Win by KO: 6

Serhat Guler is a Turkish professional boxer. He currently competes in the super middleweight division.

== Amateur career ==
Guler started his boxing career in 2014 and after racking up some big wins he quickly became the biggest prospect in Turkish boxing.

== Professional career ==
Guler turned pro in 2022 and picked up the WBC International Silver Light Heavyweight Title in just his third fight.

== Professional boxing record ==
10 fights	10 wins	0 losses
By knockout	8	0
By decision	2	0

No.	Result	Record	Opponent	Type	Round, time	Date	Location	Notes
5	Win	5–0	Branislav Malinovic	TKO	1 (10) 2:49	27 Jan 2024	Motorworld, Cologne, Germany	
4	Win	4–0	Rostam Ibrahim	KO	6 (10) 1:05	30 Sep 2023	Harzlandhalle, Ilsenburg, Germany	
3	Win	3–0	Leon Bunn	KO	10 (10) 1:10	3 Jun 2023	Universum Gym, Hamburg, Germany	
2	Win	2–0	Nikolozi Gviniashvili	KO	2 (8), 0:30	30 Apr 2023	Grosse Freiheit 36, St Pauli, Germany	
1	Win	1–0	Chico Kwasi	PTS	6	22 Oct 2022	LEO's Boxgym, Munich, Germany	
