= Hector Tanajara Jr. =

American boxer

Personal information
- Nickname: El Finito
- Born: December 13, 1996 (age 29) San Antonio, Texas, U.S.
- Height: 5 ft 10 in (178 cm)
- Weight: Lightweight

Boxing career
- Reach: 75 in (191 cm)
- Stance: Orthodox

Boxing record
- Total fights: 23
- Wins: 21
- Win by KO: 6
- Losses: 1
- Draws: 1

Hector Francisco Tanajara Jr. (born December 13, 1996) is an American professional boxer who has held the WBC-USNBC lightweight title since 2019.

== Professional career ==
Tanajara made his professional debut on August 6, 2015, scoring a first-round knockout (KO) victory over Thomas Deleon at the Belasco Theatre in Los Angeles, California.

After compiling a record of 16–0 (5 KOs) he fought for his first professional title, facing Ivan Delgado for the vacant WBC-USNBC lightweight title on February 23, 2019, at the Auditorio Fausto Gutierrez Moreno in Tijuana, Mexico. In a fight which saw Tanajara control the pace at range, he suffered a cut over his left eye in the third round from an accidental clash of heads. Tanajara's corner was able to keep the blood flow at a minimum, however, at the end of the fourth round the ringside doctor recommended the fight be stopped. The referee obliged and waved off the contest, forcing the result to rely on the scorecards for the previous four rounds. Tanajara won every round on all three judges' scorecards with 40–36, capturing the regional WBC title via unanimous technical decision (TD).

=== Tanajara vs. Gesta cancellation ===
Tanajara was scheduled to fight Mercito Gesta on the Vergil Ortiz Jr. vs. Samuel Vargas undercard in a 10-round lightweight bout. Gesta pulled out due to food poisoning cancelling the fight.

== Professional boxing record ==
20 fights	19 wins	1 loss
By knockout	5	1
By decision	14	0

No.	Result	Record	Opponent	Type	Round, time	Date	Location	Notes
20	Loss	19–1	(Mexico) William Zepeda	RTD	6 (10), 3:00	Jul 9, 2021	(United States) Banc of California Stadium, Los Angeles, California, U.S.	For vacant WBA Continental Americas lightweight title
19	Win	19–0	(Mexico) Juan Carlos Burgos	UD	10	Jan 11, 2020	(United States) Alamodome, San Antonio, Texas, U.S.	Retained WBC–USNBC lightweight title
18	Win	18–0	(Mexico) Ezequiel Aviles	UD	10	Aug 10, 2019	(United States) The Theatre at Grand Prairie, Grand Prairie, Texas, U.S.	Retained WBC–USNBC lightweight title
17	Win	17–0	(United States) Ivan Delgado	TD	4 (10), 3:00	Feb 23, 2019	Auditorio Fausto Gutierrez Moreno, Tijuana, Mexico	Won vacant WBC–USNBC lightweight title; Unanimous TD after Tanajara Jr. cut from accidental head clash
16	Win	16–0	(United States) Robert Manzanarez	UD	10	Dec 8, 2018	(United States) Fantasy Springs Resort Casino, Indio, California, U.S.	
15	Win	15–0	(Puerto Rico) Emmanuel Morales-Rodriguez	UD	8	Aug 10, 2018	(United States) Belasco Theatre, Los Angeles, California, U.S.	
14	Win	14–0	(Venezuela) Roger Gutiérrez	UD	8	Jun 23, 2018	(United States) Belasco Theatre, Los Angeles, California, U.S.	
13	Win	13–0	(Mexico) Hector Suarez	UD	8	Apr 6, 2018	(United States) Belasco Theatre, Los Angeles, California, U.S.	
12	Win	12–0	(Mexico) Eduardo Rivera	KO	1 (8), 1:58	Feb 22, 2018	(United States) Fantasy Springs Resort Casino, Indio, California, U.S.	
11	Win	11–0	(Mexico) Jesus Serrano	UD	8	Nov 2, 2017	(United States) Casino Del Sol, Tucson, Arizona, U.S.	
10	Win	10–0	(Mexico) Eduardo Rafael Reyes	MD	6	Jun 17, 2017	(United States) Tostitos Championship Plaza, Frisco, Texas, U.S.	
9	Win	9–0	(Mexico) Daniel Bastien	UD	6	May 18, 2017	(United States) Casino Del Sol, Tucson, Arizona, U.S.	
8	Win	8–0	(Mexico) Daniel Perales	UD	6	Mar 23, 2017	(United States) Fantasy Springs Resort Casino, Indio, California, U.S.	
7	Win	7–0	(United States) Roy Garcia	UD	4	Sep 17, 2016	(United States) AT&T Stadium, Arlington, Texas, U.S.	
6	Win	6–0	(Mexico) Francisco Medel	TKO	1 (6), 2:26	25 May 2016	(United States) Ray Dolby Ballroom, Los Angeles, California, U.S.	
5	Win	5–0	(United States) Clay Burns	UD	6	Feb 5, 2016	(United States) Fantasy Springs Resort Casino, Indio, California, U.S.	
4	Win	4–0	(Mexico) Jose Fabian Naranjo	KO	1 (4), 2:10	Nov 21, 2015	(United States) Mandalay Bay Events Center, Paradise, Nevada, U.S.	
3	Win	3–0	(Mexico) Ricardo Alvarado	KO	1 (4), 1:29	Nov 6, 2015	(United States) Belasco Theatre, Los Angeles, California, U.S.	
2	Win	2–0	(Mexico) José Antonio Martínez	UD	4	Sep 18, 2015	(United States) Belasco Theatre, Los Angeles, California, U.S.	
1	Win	1–0	(United States) Thomas Deleon	KO	1 (4), 1:14	Aug 6, 2015	(United States) Belasco Theatre, Los Angeles, California, U.S.	

Sporting positions
Regional boxing titles
Vacant Title last held by Demond Brock	WBC-USNBC lightweight champion February 23, 2019 – present	Incumbent
