= Marco Antonio Peribán =

Mexican boxer

Personal information
- Nickname: El Monstruo
- Born: Marco Antonio Peribán Hernández; 10 August 1984 (age 42) El Arenal, Mexico City, Mexico
- Height: 1.89 m (6 ft 2 in)
- Weight: Light Heavyweight; Super Middleweight

Boxing career
- Reach: 2.00 m (79 in)
- Stance: Orthodox

Boxing record
- Total fights: 34
- Wins: 26
- Win by KO: 17
- Losses: 7
- Draws: 1

Marco Antonio Peribán Hernández (born 10 August 1984) is a Mexican professional boxer. He is signed with Oscar De La Hoya's Company Golden Boy Promotions.

== Personal life ==
He is the brother of the professional female boxer Guadalupe Peribán, also signed with Golden Boy Promotions.

== Amateur career ==
Peribán had an outstanding amateur career which included wins over American Shawn Porter. He had numerous national championships in Mexico, was a member of the Mexican national team, and in the 2006 Central American and Caribbean Games won a bronze medal.

== Professional career ==
Peribán won his pro debut against Oscar Solis by third round knock-out. Periban is a very skilled fighter with one of the hardest punches of Mexican Boxing history and one of the few bright spots for Mexican boxing above 160 pounds. Marco achieved international fame after his US and Golden Boy Promotions debut fight over the then 10-0 Roger & Floyd Mayweather´s prospect Dion Savage Jr. in San Diego, California. The fight lasted just 33 seconds as Peribán knocked Savage out with a fast left-right combination in the first round.

== Professional record ==
25 Wins (16 knockouts), 5 Losses, 1 Draw
Res.	Record	Opponent	Type	Rd., Time	Date	Location	Notes
Loss	26-6-1	(Republic of Ireland) Padraig McCrory	TKO	5 (10), 2:14	2022-08-06	(United Kingdom) SSE Arena Belfast, Belfast, Northern Ireland	For WBC International Silver Super Middle
Win	26-5-1	(Mexico) Gabriel Garcia	TKO	11 (12), 0:35	2022-04-30	(Mexico) Papas & Beer, Rosarito	
Loss	25-5-1	(United Kingdom) Joshua Buatsi	TKO	4 (10), 1:39	2019-06-01	(United States) Madison Square Garden, New York City, New York	For WBA International Light Heavyweight title
Loss	25-4-1	(Turkey) Avni Yıldırım	UD	12	2017-05-13	(Mexico) Jalisco	For WBC International super middleweight title
Win	25-3-1	(Argentina) German Rafael	MD	8	2016-05-14	Arena Coliseo, Mexico City	
Win	24-3-1	(Colombia) Jose Miguel Torres	KO	4 (10), 1:07	2016-02-13	(Mexico) Palenque El Marqués, Queretaro, Queretaro	
Win	23-3-1	(Ghana) Joshua Okine	KO	3 (10), 0:51	2015-10-17	(Mexico) Auditorio Benito Juárez, Veracruz, Veracruz	
Win	22-3-1	(Argentina) Carlos Adan Jerez	TKO	5 (10), 1:22	2015-06-27	(Mexico) Centro Civico de Ecatepec, Ecatepec, State of México	
Win	21-3-1	(Argentina) Octavio Castro	UD	6	2015-03-14	(Mexico) Auditorio Municipal, Naucalpan, State of México	
Loss	20-3-1	(United Kingdom) James DeGale	TKO	3 (12), 0:30	2014-11-29	(United Kingdom) Echo Arena, Liverpool, England	
Loss	20-2-1	(United States) J'Leon Love	UD	10	2014-05-03	(United States) MGM Grand, Las Vegas, Nevada	
Draw	20-1-1	(Sweden) Badou Jack	MD	10	2013-09-12	(United States) MGM Grand, Las Vegas, Nevada	
Loss	20-1	(Cameroon) Sakio Bika	MD	12	2013-06-22	(United States) Barclays Center, Brooklyn, New York	For vacant WBC super middleweight title
Win	20-0	(Colombia) Samuel Miller	KO	2 (10) 2:46	2013-03-16	(Mexico) Cancun, Quintana Roo	Won vacant NABF super middleweight title
Win	19-0	(Mexico) Francisco Sierra	MD	10	2012-11-17	(Mexico) Cuautlancingo, Puebla	
Win	18-0	(Cuba) Lester González	RTD	9 (10), 0:10	2012-07-14	(United States) Humble Civic Center, Humble, Texas	
Win	17-0	(Mexico) Gerardo Díaz	TKO	2 (10), 2:52	2012-03-31	(Mexico) Oasis Hotel Complex, Cancun, Quintana Roo, México	
Win	16-0	(Mexico) Jesús Ángel Nerio	UD	8	2012-01-21	(Mexico) Bodega Del Boxeo, Ensenada, Baja California, México	
Win	15-0	(United States) Dhafir Smith	UD	8	2011-09-17	(United States) MGM Grand Garden Arena, Las Vegas, Nevada	
Win	14-0	(Mexico) Alfredo Contreras	UD	8	2011-06-18	(Mexico) Arena VFG, Guadalajara, Jalisco	
Win	13-0	(Argentina) José Clavero	KO	2 (10)	2011-04-30	(Mexico) Coliseum Don King, Texcoco, México	
Win	12-0	(Mexico) Alfredo Mejía	KO	1 (10), 1:45	2011-3-26	(Mexico) El Nido de los Halcones-Instituto de la Juventud, Xalapa, Veracruz	
Win	11-0	(United States) Dion Savage	KO	1 (8), 0:33	2011-2-25	(United States) Four Points Sheraton Hotel, San Diego, California	
Win	10-0	(United States) Darnell Boone	TKO	1 (8), 1:20	2010-12-03	Coliseo Olimpico de la UG, Guadalajara, Jalisco, Mexico	
Win	9-0	(Argentina) Franco Sánchez	TKO	5 (8), 2:18	2010-07-30	Cancún, Quintana Roo, Mexico	
Win	8-0	(Canada) Jason Naugler	TKO	5 (8), 1:37	2010-06-25	Auditorio Plaza Condesa, Mexico City, Mexico	
Win	7-0	(Mexico) Salomon Rodríguez	SD	6	2010-03-26	Auditorio Plaza Condesa, Mexico City, Distrito Federal, Mexico	
Win	6-0	(Uruguay) Richard Vidal	UD	6	2009-11-21	Buenos Aires Tennis Club, Buenos Aires, Argentina	
Win	5-0	(Argentina) Daniel Comaschi	TKO	3 (6)	2009-08-08	Polideportivo Carlos Cerutti, Córdoba, Argentina	
Win	4-0	(Mexico) Hector Macias	TKO	2 (4), 1:15	2009-04-25	Arena Miguel Solis, Cozumel, Quintana Roo, Mexico	
Win	3-0	(Mexico) Pedro Esquer	TKO	1 (4)	2009-01-31	Palenque del FEX, Mexicali, Baja California, Mexico	
Win	2-0	(Mexico) Miguel Zamarripa	UD	4	2008-11-01	Gimnasio Manuel Aguirre, Chihuahua, Chihuahua, Mexico	
Win	1-0	(Mexico) Óscar Solis	TKO	3 (4), 2:20	2008-09-20	Arena Coliseo, Monterrey, Nuevo León, Mexico	
