= Siro Choi =

Uzbek boxer (born 2001)

Personal information
- Nationality: Uzbekistani
- Born: Sirochbek Ismoilov; 16 March 2001 (age 25) Andijan, Uzbekistan
- Height: 5 ft 8 1/2 in (174 cm)
- Weight: Lightweight

Boxing career
- Reach: 69 1/2 in (177 cm)
- Stance: Southpaw

Boxing record
- Total fights: 12
- Wins: 12
- Win by KO: 9

Siro Choi (born 16 March 2001) is an Uzbekistani professional boxer who currently competes in the lightweight division.

== Amateur career ==
As an amateur Choi as a member of the Uzbekistan national team. He won a silver medal at the Commonwealth of Independent States.

== Professional career ==
Choi claimed the first belt of his pro career, the South Korea lightweight title against Juanito Paredes of the Philippines. Choi stopped Paredes in the fourth round. Choi claimed his second pro belt and the biggest win of his career so far against Shuichiro Yoshino to capture the WBA Asian lightweight belt. Choi dominated the fight from the start and after dropping Yoshiro in the 10th round the referee jumped in to end the bout in the eleventh round.

== Professional boxing record ==
12 fights	12 wins	0 losses
By knockout	9	0
By decision	3	0

No.	Result	Record	Opponent	Type	Round, time	Date	Location	Notes
12	Win	12–0	Giovanni Cabrera	TKO	3 (12), 2:45	5 Apr 2026	Culture Center, Namyangju, South Korea	Retained WBA Asia lightweight title
11	Win	11–0	Ruben Santillanosa	KO	2 (10), 3:10	11 Oct 2025	Fashion Center Event Hall, Seoul, South Korea	
10	Win	10–0	Shuichiro Yoshino	TKO	11 (12), 1:29	19 Apr 2025	Culture Center, Namyangju, South Korea	Retained WBA Asia lightweight title
9	Win	9–0	Michael Correa	KO	3 (10), 1:55	15 Feb 2025	Clean Hit Boxing Gym, Pyeongtaek, South Korea	
8	Win	8–0	Mark Sales	RTD	3 (10), 3:00	30 Nov 2024	Okcheon Sports Center, Okcheon, South Korea	
7	Win	7–0	Ji Sub Oh	KO	2 (12), 1:21	13 Oct 2024	Dongdaemungu Gymnasium, Seoul, South Korea	Won vacant WBA Asia lightweight title
6	Win	6–0	Juanito Paredes	TKO	4 (10), 2:06	3 Aug 2024	Cheongpyeong Family Hotel, Cheongpyeong, South Korea	
5	Win	5–0	Sunil Kumar	RTD	3 (8), 3:00	29 Jun 2024	Nova Boxing Gymnasium, Incheon, South Korea	
4	Win	4–0	Bhinder Singh	KO	1 (6), 2:44	18 May 2024	Cheongpyeong Family Hotel, Cheongpyeong, South Korea	
3	Win	3–0	Jae Joon Go	UD	4	2 Mar 2024	Pocheon Sports Complex, Pocheon, South Korea	
2	Win	2–0	Minh Quan Phan	UD	6	8 Oct 2023	Pocheon Sports Complex, Pocheon, South Korea	
1	Win	1–0	In Ho Choi	UD	6	29 Jul 2023	Cheongpyeong Family Hotel, Cheongpyeong, South Korea	
