= Edgar Berlanga =

American boxer (born 1997)

Edgar Berlanga Jr
Personal information
- Born: Edgar Luis Berlanga; May 18, 1997 (age 29) Brooklyn, New York City, U.S.
- Height: 6 ft 1 in (185 cm)
- Weight: Middleweight; Super middleweight

Boxing career
- Reach: 73 in (185 cm)
- Stance: Orthodox

Boxing record
- Total fights: 26
- Wins: 24
- Win by KO: 19
- Losses: 2
Medal record
Men's amateur boxing
Representing United States
US Youth National Championships
Bronze medal – third place	2013 Reno	Welterweight
Gold medal – first place	2015 Reno	Middleweight
USA Junior National Championships
Silver medal – second place	2013 Mobile	Welterweight
US National PAL Junior Championships
Silver medal – second place	2013 Oxnard	Welterweight

Edgar Luis Berlanga Jr. (born May 18, 1997) is an American professional boxer. He challenged for the unified super middleweight championship in 2024.

== Early life ==
Berlanga was born to the large Nuyorican community of Brooklyn, to parents from Puerto Rico. He started boxing at the age of 7, As a child, he was a fan of Félix Trinidad, a former world champion who frequently fought at Madison Square Garden. When queried about his heritage, Berlanga responded “I feel a hundred percent Puerto Rican [...] I was born over there, but belong here. I am very Puerto Rican”. He also emphasized that most of his family still resides on the islands, and that when he boxes he represents them and its "beautiful flag."

== Amateur career ==
Berlanga began boxing at the age of seven, gathering an amateur record of 162–17.

== Professional career ==
=== Early career ===
Berlanga made his professional debut on April 29, 2016, scoring a first-round knockout (KO) victory against Jorge Pedroza at Isla San Marcos in Aguascalientes City, Mexico. He has gone on to compile a record of 23–2, with 18 knockouts, 16 coming by first-round stoppage.

==== Chasing the record ====
By late 2020, Berlanga's record had improved to 16–0, with all of his victories coming in the 1st round, although some critics would consider his previous opponents, "tin cans", catching the attention of media as he was closing in on the official world record for consecutive 1st-round KOs held by Ali Raymi. On December 12, 2020, Berlanga equalled Young Otto's record when he knocked out Ulises Sierra in the first round. Berlanga's attempt to capture the world record for consecutive 1st-round KOs ended on April 24, 2021 when he was taken the full distance in his unanimous decision victory against Demond Nicholson in his 17th pro fight.

=== Rise up the ranks ===
==== Berlanga vs. Cóceres ====
On October 9, 2021 on the undercard of Tyson Fury vs. Deontay Wilder III, Berlanga overcame a knockdown in the ninth round against former WBO title challenger Marcelo Cóceres to attain his eighteenth successive professional victory. He won via unanimous decision with all three scorecards reading 96–93.

==== Berlanga vs. Angulo ====
Berlanga attracted controversy due to an incident during his June 11, 2022 fight against Roamer Alexis Angulo, during which a frustrated Berlanga attempted to bite Angulo on the shoulder. The incident was not noticed at the time by referee Ricky Gonzales. Berlanga went on to win the fight by unanimous decision. The following day Berlanga joked about the incident saying "I was about to do a Mike Tyson on him". Berlanga received criticism for this comment and later apologized. The New York State Athletic Commission later fined Berlanga $10,000 and suspended him from professional boxing for a period of six months for the incident.

==== Berlanga vs. McCrory ====
On February 24, 2024 in Orlando, Florida, Berlanga faced Padraig McCrory in a 12-round bout at super middleweight. He won the fight by TKO in the sixth round.

=== World title challenge ===
==== Berlanga vs. Álvarez ====
Berlanga challenged Canelo Álvarez for his WBA, WBC and WBO super middleweight titles at T-Mobile Arena in Las Vegas on September 14, 2024. He lost the fight by unanimous decision.

=== Attempting to regain composure ===
==== Berlanga vs Ortiz ====
Berlanga returned to the ring in on March 15, 2025, in Orlando, Florida against Jonathan González Ortiz. Berlanga won by TKO in the first round, securing two knockdowns along the way. Berlanga missed the super middleweight limit by 1.6 lbs, but was still eligible to win the title.

==== Berlanga vs Sheeraz ====
After Berlanga's comeback win in March 2025, Berlanga wanted the hardest fight possible and thus accepted a fight with 6'3" undefeated Hamzah Sheeraz immediately. Sheeraz vs. Berlanga would headline the Riyadh Season fight night. Berlanga was confident coming into the fight despite all sports books marking him as the underdog. Both weighed the same 167.6 pounds.

Berlanga showed heart by surviving a clean knockout punch that affected him for the rest of the fight, he was down twice in the fourth round with a series of combinations, leaving the latter visibly shaken and struggling to survive until the end of the round. As the fifth round commenced, Sheeraz concluded the bout decisively with a right-left combination, sending Berlanga to the canvas for the third time. The referee, David Fields, promptly stopped the fight just 17 seconds into the round. According to CompuBox, Sheeraz landed 62 of 162 punches thrown (38.3%) and Berlanga landed 46 of his 119 thrown (38.7%).

On February 28, 2026, it was reported that Chris Eubank Jr. was in talks with Belanga's team for a fight in the first half of the year. At this stage, the main obstacle in arranging the fight was the weight. Eubank preferred a 164 pound catchweight, while Berlanga insisted he could not go below 168 pounds. Berlanga tweeted the fight could take place in London.

=== Zuffa Boxing ===
On April 8, it was announced that Berlanga, along with super lightweight world champion Richardson Hitchins, signed a multi-fight deals with Zuffa Boxing. A debut would be scheduled for Summer 2026. Berlanga was planning on moving up in weight to compete in the light heavyweight division, which aligned with Zuffa’s recognised weight divisions.

==== Berlanga vs Butler ====
Berlanga faced Steven Butler in a 10-round super middleweight main event at Zuffa Boxing 09 at the Infosys Theater at Madison Square Garden in New York City, New York, on July 26, 2026. He was sent to the canvas in the second round but recovered to continue the bout and scored a knockdown of his own in the sixth round. Berlanga won by technical knockout when the referee halted the fight in the seventh round as Butler came under a sustained barrage of unanswered punches.

== Outside of boxing ==
On October 28, 2026, it was reported by TMZ that Berlanga had been arrested in connection with an alleged domestic violence incident in Polk County, Florida. Berlanga was charged with felony aggravated battery and misdemeanor battery after a woman, the mother of his child, reported that he had assaulted her during an argument. There were injuries observed on the woman, which were consistent with her allegations. The argument took place in a vehicle. It was alleged that Berlanga slapped the woman and then struck her in the head with a pistol. The woman then fled to a nearby 7-Eleven, where witnesses then contacted the police.

== Professional boxing record ==
26 fights	24 wins	2 losses
By knockout	19	1
By decision	5	1

No.	Result	Record	Opponent	Type	Round, time	Date	Location	Notes
26	Win	24-2	Steven Butler	TKO	7 (10), 1:14	Jul 26, 2026	The Theater at Madison Square Garden, New York City, New York, U.S.	
25	Loss	23–2	Hamzah Sheeraz	KO	5 (12), 0:17	Jul 12, 2025	Louis Armstrong Stadium, New York City, New York, U.S.	
24	Win	23–1	Jonathan González Ortiz	KO	1 (10) 2:31	Mar 15, 2025	Caribe Royale, Orlando, Florida, U.S.	Won vacant NABO super middleweight title
23	Loss	22–1	Canelo Álvarez	UD	12	Sep 14, 2024	T-Mobile Arena, Paradise, Nevada, U.S.	For WBA (Super), WBC, WBO, and The Ring super middleweight titles
22	Win	22–0	Padraig McCrory	TKO	6 (12), 2:44	Feb 24, 2024	Caribe Royale, Orlando, Florida, U.S.	
21	Win	21–0	Jason Quigley	UD	12	Jun 24, 2023	Hulu Theater, New York City, New York, U.S.	Retained NABO super middleweight title
20	Win	20–0	Roamer Alexis Angulo	UD	10	Jun 11, 2022	Hulu Theater, New York City, New York, U.S.	Retained NABO super middleweight title
19	Win	19–0	Steve Rolls	UD	10	Mar 19, 2022	Hulu Theater, New York City, New York, U.S.	Retained NABO super middleweight title
18	Win	18–0	Marcelo Cóceres	UD	10	Oct 9, 2021	T-Mobile Arena, Paradise, Las Vegas, Nevada, US	Won vacant NABO super middleweight title
17	Win	17–0	Demond Nicholson	UD	8	Apr 24, 2021	Silver Spurs Arena, Kissimmee, Florida, U.S.	
16	Win	16–0	Ulises Sierra	TKO	1 (8), 2:41	Dec 12, 2020	MGM Grand Conference Center, Paradise, Nevada, U.S.	
15	Win	15–0	Lanell Bellows	TKO	1 (8), 1:29	Oct 17, 2020	MGM Grand Conference Center, Paradise, Nevada, U.S.	
14	Win	14–0	Eric Moon	KO	1 (8), 1:02	Jul 21, 2020	MGM Grand Conference Center, Paradise, Nevada, U.S.	
13	Win	13–0	Cesar Nunez	TKO	1 (8), 2:45	Dec 14, 2019	Madison Square Garden, New York City, New York, U.S.	
12	Win	12–0	Gregory Trenel	TKO	1 (8), 2:24	Aug 10, 2019	Liacouras Center, Philadelphia, Pennsylvania, U.S.	
11	Win	11–0	Gyorgy Varju	KO	1 (8), 0:43	May 25, 2019	Osceola Heritage Park, Kissimmee, Florida, U.S.	
10	Win	10–0	Samir dos Santos Barbosa	TKO	1 (8), 0:46	Apr 20, 2019	Madison Square Garden, New York City, New York, U.S.	
9	Win	9–0	Gregory Clark	TKO	1 (6), 2:29	Sep 29, 2018	Kings Theatre, New York City, New York, U.S.	
8	Win	8–0	Aaron Garcia	TKO	1 (6), 1:24	Jun 9, 2018	Kings Theatre, New York City, New York, U.S.	
7	Win	7–0	Jaime Barboza	TKO	1 (6), 2:42	Jan 26, 2018	SugarHouse Casino, Philadelphia, Pennsylvania, U.S.	
6	Win	6–0	Enrique Gallegos	TKO	1 (6), 1:42	Nov 18, 2017	Resorts World Casino, New York City, New York, U.S.	
5	Win	5–0	Saadiq Muhammad	KO	1 (4), 0:41	Sep 9, 2017	Resorts World Casino, New York City, New York, U.S.	
4	Win	4–0	Christopher Salerno	TKO	1 (4), 1:14	Mar 24, 2017	Orlando Live Event Center, Orlando, Florida, U.S.	
3	Win	3–0	Jose Alberto Leal	TKO	1 (4), 2:40	Nov 18, 2016	Cancha IV Centenario, Aguascalientes City, Mexico	
2	Win	2–0	Jose Antonio Leos Nery	KO	1 (4), 0:49	Jun 16, 2016	Auditorio Hermanos Carréon, Aguascalientes City, Mexico	
1	Win	1–0	Jorge Pedroza	KO	1 (4), 1:02	Apr 29, 2016	Isla San Marcos, Aguascalientes City, Mexico	

Achievements
Vacant Title last held by Himself	NABO super middleweight champion March 16, 2025 – present	Incumbent
