= Shuichiro Yoshino =

Japanese boxer (born 1991)

Shuichiro Yoshino 吉野修一郎
Personal information
- Nationality: Japanese
- Born: 28 September 1991 (age 34) Kanuma, Tochigi, Japan
- Height: 5 ft 9 in (175 cm)
- Weight: Lightweight

Boxing career
- Reach: 68 in (173 cm)
- Stance: Orthodox

Boxing record
- Total fights: 19
- Wins: 17
- Win by KO: 13
- Losses: 2

Shuichiro Yoshino (born 28 September 1991) is a Japanese professional boxer, who has held the WBO Asia Pacific title since 2020. He is ranked as the world's 9th best active lightweight by BoxRec.

== Professional career ==
=== Early career ===
Yoshino made his professional debut against Chatri Charoensin on 14 December 2015. He won the fight by a third-round technical knockout. Yoshino next faced the 58-fight veteran Chaiyong Chanthahong on 11 February 2016. He won the fight by unanimous decision, with scores of 60–54, 60–54 and 59–55.

Yoshino face the former Japanese and OPBF lightweight champion Yoshitaka Kato on 13 April 2017. He won the fight by unanimous decision, with scores of 80–72, 77–75 and 78–75. Yoshino faced the overmatched Katika Piyawong on 10 August 2017. He made quick work of Katika, winning the bout by a second-round technical knockout.

=== Japanese lightweight champion ===
Yoshino was booked to face the veteran Spicy Matsushita for the vacant Japanese lightweight title on 21 October 2017. He won the fight by a seventh-round technical knockout. He was leading on two of the judges' scorecards at the time of the stoppage (58–56), while the third judge had the fight as an even 57–57.

Yoshino made his first Japanese lightweight title defense against Masaki Saito on 8 February 2018. He won the fight by a first-round technical knockout. Yoshino made his second title defense against Genki Maeda on 14 June 2018. He won the fight by a ninth-round knockout. Yoshino made his third title defense against Kazumasa Kobayashi on 13 December 2018. He won the fight by a third-round technical knockout. Yoshino made his fourth title defense against Accel Sumiyoshi on 11 April 2019. He won the fight by a seventh-round technical knockout.

Yoshino was booked to face Harmonito Dela Torre for the vacant WBO Asia Pacific and OPBF lightweight titles on 10 October 2019. He made quick work of Torre, as he won the fight by a first-round technical knockout. After capturing two regional titles, Yoshino made his fifth Japanese title defense against Izuki Tomioka on 13 February 2020. He won the fight by an eight-round technical knockout. Yoshino made the first defense of all three minor titles simultaneously on 3 September 2020, against Valentine Hosokawa. He won the fight by a dominant unanimous decision, with scores of 120–108, 119–109 and 119–109. It was his first decision victory since 13 April 2017.

Yoshino made his seventh Japanese lightweight title defense against Shuma Nakazato on 12 August 2021, following an eleven-month absence from the sport. He won the fight by a sixth-round technical knockout. Yoshino was booked to defend his WBO Asia Pacific and OPBF titles against the former WBO junior lightweight champion Masayuki Ito on 9 April 2022. He won the fight by an eleventh-round technical decision, with scores of 106–103, 107–102, and 107–102.

Yoshino made his third WBO Asia Pacific title defense against Masayoshi Nakatani on 1 November 2022, on the undercard of the Kenshiro Teraji and Hiroto Kyoguchi light flyweight unification bout. He retained his title by a sixth-round knockout, after twice knocking Nakatani down.

On 11 January 2023, it was revealed that Yoshino had accepted an order from the WBC to face Shakur Stevenson in a lightweight title eliminator. Yoshino was booked to face Stevenson on 8 April 2023, at the Prudential Center in Newark, New Jersey. He lost the fight by a sixth-round technical knockout.

== Professional boxing record ==
19 fights	17 wins	2 losses
By knockout	13	2
By decision	4	0

No.	Result	Record	Opponent	Type	Round, time	Date	Location	Notes
19	Loss	17–2	Siro Choi	TKO	2 (8), 2:52	19 Apr 2025	Culture Center, Namyangju, South Korea	
18	Win	17–1	Jules Victoriano	TKO	2 (8), 2:52	17 Jun 2024	Korakuen Hall, Tokyo, Japan	
17	Loss	16–1	Shakur Stevenson	TKO	6 (12), 1:35	8 Apr 2023	Prudential Center, Newark, New Jersey, U.S.	
16	Win	16–0	Masayoshi Nakatani	KO	6 (12), 1:14	1 Nov 2022	Saitama Super Arena, Saitama, Japan	Retained WBO Asia Pacific lightweight title
15	Win	15–0	Masayuki Ito	TD	11 (12), 2:06	9 Apr 2022	Saitama Super Arena, Saitama, Japan	Retained WBO Asia Pacific and OPBF lightweight titles; Unanimous TD after Ito was cut in an accidental head clash
14	Win	14–0	Shuma Nakazato	TKO	6 (10), 2:20	12 Aug 2021	Korakuen Hall, Tokyo, Japan	Retained Japanese lightweight title
13	Win	13–0	Valentine Hosokawa	UD	12	3 Sep 2020	Korakuen Hall, Tokyo, Japan	Retained Japanese, OPBF and WBO Asia Pacific lightweight titles
12	Win	12–0	Izuki Tomioka	TKO	8 (10), 1:55	13 Feb 2020	Korakuen Hall, Tokyo, Japan	Retained Japanese lightweight title
11	Win	11–0	Harmonito Dela Torre	TKO	1 (12), 2:10	10 Oct 2019	Korakuen Hall, Tokyo, Japan	Won vacant WBO Asia Pacific and OPBF lightweight titles
10	Win	10–0	Accel Sumiyoshi	TKO	7 (10), 2:12	11 Apr 2019	Korakuen Hall, Tokyo, Japan	Retained Japanese lightweight title
9	Win	9–0	Kazumasa Kobayashi	TKO	3 (10), 1:37	13 Dec 2018	Korakuen Hall, Tokyo, Japan	Retained Japanese lightweight title
8	Win	8–0	Genki Maeda	KO	9 (10), 2:49	14 Jun 2018	Korakuen Hall, Tokyo, Japan	Retained Japanese lightweight title
7	Win	7–0	Masaki Saito	TKO	1 (10), 2:36	8 Feb 2018	Korakuen Hall, Tokyo, Japan	Retained Japanese lightweight title
6	Win	6–0	Spicy Matsushita	TKO	7 (10), 1:23	21 Oct 2017	Korakuen Hall, Tokyo, Japan	Won vacant Japanese lightweight title
5	Win	5–0	Katika Piyawong	TKO	2 (8), 0:30	10 Aug 2017	Korakuen Hall, Tokyo, Japan	
4	Win	4–0	Yoshitaka Kato	UD	8	13 Apr 2017	Korakuen Hall, Tokyo, Japan	
3	Win	3–0	Kenta Onjo	TKO	3 (8), 0:51	13 Oct 2016	Korakuen Hall, Tokyo, Japan	
2	Win	2–0	Chaiyong Chanthahong	UD	6	11 Feb 2016	Korakuen Hall, Tokyo, Japan	
1	Win	1–0	Chatri Charoensin	TKO	3 (6), 2:40	14 Dec 2015	Korakuen Hall, Tokyo, Japan	
