= Edgar Berlanga vs. Hamzah Sheeraz =

Boxing competition

- Date: July 12, 2025
- Venue: Louis Armstrong Stadium, Queens, New York
- Title(s) on the line: WBC super middleweight title eliminator

Tale of the tape
Boxer	Edgar Berlanga	Hamzah Sheeraz
Hometown	Brooklyn, New York, U.S.	Slough, England
Pre-fight record	23–1 (18 KOs)	21–0–1 (17 KOs)
Age	28 years, 1 month	26 years, 1 month
Height	6 ft 1 in (1.85 m)	6 ft 3 in (1.91 m)
Style	Orthodox	Orthodox
Recognition	The Ring; No. 9 ranked super middleweight	

Result
- Sheeraz wins by TKO in round 5

Shakur Stevenson vs. William Zepeda
- Date: July 12, 2025
- Venue: New York City, New York, U.S.
- Title(s) on the line: WBC lightweight title

Tale of the tape
Boxer	Shakur Stevenson	William Zepeda
Nickname	Fearless	Camarón
Hometown	Newark, New Jersey, U.S.	San Mateo Atenco, Mexico
Pre-fight record	23–0 (11 KOs)	33–0 (27 KOs)
Age	28 years	29 years, 1 month
Height	5 ft 8 in (1.73 m)	5 ft 9 in (1.75 m)
Style	Southpaw	Southpaw
Recognition	WBC lightweight champion The Ring; No. 4 ranked lightweight	WBC interim lightweight champion

Result
- Stevenson wins by unanimous decision (118–110, 118–110, 119–109)

The Ring III was the billing of a professional boxing event serving as a double feature. The first, Edgar Berlanga vs. Hamzah Sheeraz, was a super middleweight professional boxing match contested between Edgar Berlanga and Hamzah Sheeraz in a WBC super middleweight title eliminator. The second, Shakur Stevenson vs. William Zepeda, was a lightweight professional boxing match contested between WBC lightweight champion Shakur Stevenson and WBC interim lightweight champion William Zepeda for WBC lightweight title. The event took place on July 12, 2025, at Louis Armstrong Stadium in Queens, New York City, New York, U.S.Hamzah Sheeraz defeated Edgar Berlanga by TKO in the fifth round, while Shakur Stevenson successfully defended his WBC lightweight title against William Zepeda by UD.

== Background ==
Berlanga entered the bout after suffering his first professional defeat against Canelo Álvarez via unanimous decision in September 2024.He returned with a first-round knockout victory over Jonathan Gonzalez-Ortiz on March 15, 2025.

Sheeraz moved up to super middleweight following a controversial draw against WBC middleweight champion Carlos Adames in February 2025.

=== Pre-fight build up ===
On 20 April, Ring Magazine announced a card to take place in New York, promoted by themselves on 12 July 2025 on DAZN. Sheeraz was revealed to headline the card against former world title challenger, Edgar Berlanga (23–1, 18 KOs), in a WBC title eliminator. Berlanga's sole career defeat came against Canelo Álvarez via unanimous decision in September 2024. He had a comeback win in March 2025, prior to the fight being announced. It was reported the co-headline fight, featuring Shakur Stevenson and William Zepeda will be treated as the main event during fight week, however on Sheeraz vs. Berlanga would headline the card itself on fight night. There was some in the media discussing whether the fight deserved to close the event.

On 15 May, Ring Magazine announced the card would take place at the Louis Armstrong Stadium, located in USTA Billie Jean King National Tennis Center in the Flushing Meadows-Corona Park in Queens. This would mark the first time the stadium would host a boxing event. From the moment the bout was confirmed, tensions flared between the two fighters, kicking off at the launch press conference. Berlanga taunted Sheeraz about his previous match, stating, “You received a gift in your last fight. Even your trainer acknowledged that you lost.” Sheeraz fired back, saying, “If we’re discussing past fights, you’re Canelo’s bitch,” alluding to Berlanga’s only career defeat.

The sports books had Berlanga as a +125 underdog, with Sheeraz -155. Both weighed the same 167.6 pounds.

== Fight details ==
Sheeraz delivered a flawless fifth-round knockout against Berlanga in their WBC title eliminator. Sheeraz showcased his power by knocking Berlanga down twice in the fourth round with a series of combinations, leaving the latter visibly shaken and struggling to survive until the end of the round. As the fifth round commenced, Sheeraz concluded the bout decisively with a right-left combination, sending Berlanga to the canvas for the third time. The referee, David Fields, promptly stopped the fight just 17 seconds into the round.

=== CompuBox ===
According to CompuBox, Sheeraz landed 62 of 162 punches thrown (38.3%) and Berlanga landed 46 of his 119 thrown (38.7).

== Post-fight ==
After the fight Sheeraz addressed the talks about him fighting Canelo Álvarez in 2026. He responded, "It would be an honor to share the ring with him; it genuinely would. Someone I've looked up to, and next thing you know you're in the ring with them. I'll put on a good performance because that's what it's about, daring to be great and I'll do just that." Sheeraz addressed the $100,000 wager that he and Berlanga had agreed upon. However, Sheeraz informed Berlanga to keep the money, citing his religious beliefs that prohibit gambling. The bet was originally proposed by Berlanga.

== Fight card ==
Main card
Weight class		vs.		Method	Round	Time	Notes
Super middleweight	Hamzah Sheeraz	def.	Edgar Berlanga	KO	5/12	0:17	^{Note 1}
Lightweight	Shakur Stevenson (c)	def.	William Zepeda	UD	12/12		^{Note 2}
Super lightweight	Alberto Puello (c)	def.	Subriel Matias	MD	12/12		^{Note 3}
Light heavyweight	David Morrell	def.	Imam Khataev	SD	10/10		^{Note 4}
Undercard
Lightweight	Reito Tsutsumi	def.	Michael Ruiz	TKO	2/4	0:28	^{Note 5}

^Note 1 For WBC super middleweight title eliminator. Berlanga was knocked down twice in round 4.
^Note 2 For WBC lightweight title. Scores: 118–110, 118–110, 119–109.
^Note 3 For WBC super lightweight title.
^Note 4 Morrell was knocked down in round 5.
^Note 5 Ruiz was knocked down twice in round 1 and once in round 2.
