= Leon Bunn =

German boxer

Personal information
- Nationality: German
- Born: 27 August 1992 (age 34) Frankfurt, Germany
- Height: 5 ft 11 in (180 cm)
- Weight: Light-Heavyweight

Boxing career
- Stance: Orthodox

Boxing record
- Total fights: 21
- Wins: 19
- Win by KO: 10
- Losses: 2

Leon Bunn (born 27 August 1992), is a German professional boxer, competing in light heavyweight.

== Amateur career ==
Bunn's amateur record was 80/25/7 (won/lost/draw). He won numerous federal and national championships. From 2011 to 2014 Bunn remained undefeated as a German division contender in German Boxing Bundesliga in 13 bouts, fighting for CSC Frankfurt and SV Nordhausen. In 2014 Bunn and his team SV Nordhausen won the German national team championship before he reached finals of the German national light heavyweight championship earning a second place by fight cancellation due to Bunn's cut injury from semi finals. In 2015 he reached finals again and succeeded to win the German national light heavyweight championship after already winning the prestigious international Chemistry Cup in Halle, which is an AIBA tournament of highest category, by defeating Switzerland's Uke Smajli.

- 11-times Champion of Hesse (2005–2015)
- 2010: German Junior Champion of Olympic Boxing
- German Division (Bundesliga)-Season 2011/2012: Undefeated in six bouts for CSC Frankfurt (2nd German Division)
- German Division (Bundesliga)-Season 2012/2013: Undefeated in two bouts for SV Nordhausen (1st German Division)
- German Division (Bundesliga)-Season 2013/2014: Undefeated in five bouts for SV Nordhausen (1st German Division)
- 2014: Round Robin Tournament winner: Germany vs Russia. Award for best techniques
- 2014: German Light Heavyweight Vice Champion
- 2014: German Team Champion 1st division for SV Nordhausen
- 2015: German Light Heavyweight Champion
- 2015: Chemistry Cup International Light Heavyweight Champion

== Pro career ==
Leon Bunn's professional debut took place on 3 December 2016 in Sofia, when he defeated his opponent Gordan Glisic by first round TKO. Bunn was signed by Sauerland Events and is coached by Ulli Wegner.

In 2017 Bunn also won his Sauerland debut and four more consecutive fights by KO. In his sixth fight as a professional he defeated his opponent Tomasz Gargula (POL) in round 5 via TKO although he had a broken hand.

Bunn fought six times in 2018, including bouts in Norway and Croatia. Bunn was able to elaborate his professional record by five unanimous decisions and another TKO remaining unbeaten in all of his first twelve fights.

After fighting Viktor Polyakov in Koblenz on 16 February 2019 Bunn was announced to fight German contender Leon Harth for IBF's International Light Heavyweight title in Frankfurt's Fraport Arena on 4 May.

== Professional boxing record ==
21 fights	19 wins	2 losses
By knockout	10	2
By decision	9	0

No.	Result	Record	Opponent	Type	Round, time	Date	Location	Notes
21	Loss	19–2	(Turkey) Serhat Guler	KO	10 (10), 1:10	3 Jun 2023	Universum Gym, Hamburg, Germany	For vacant WBC International Silver light-heavyweight title
20	Win	19–1	(Bosnia and Herzegovina) Slaviša Simeunović	RTD	1 (8), 3:00	30 Apr 2023	Grosse Freiheit 36, Hamburg, Germany	
19	Loss	18–1	(Republic of Ireland) Padraig McCrory	TKO	6 (12), 1:58	22 Oct 2022	Fabriksporthalle, Frankfurt, Germany	For vacant IBO light-heavyweight title
18	Win	18–0	(Belgium) Islam Teffahi	KO	2 (8), 2:20	7 May 2022	Sartory-Saal, Cologne, Germany	
17	Win	17–0	(Georgia (country)) Iago Kiziria	MD	8	3 Dec 2021	Harzlandhalle, Ilsenburg, Germany	
16	Win	16–0	(Finland) Timo Laine	UD	8	26 Sep 2020	Plazamedia Broadcasting Center, Munich, Germany	
15	Win	15–0	(Germany) Enrico Kölling	UD	12	2 Nov 2019	Conlog Arena, Koblenz, Germany	Retained IBF International light-heavyweight title
14	Win	14–0	(Germany) Leon Harth	TKO	9 (10), 2:45	4 May 2019	Fraport Arena, Frankfurt, Germany	Won vacant IBF International light-heavyweight title
13	Win	13–0	(Ukraine) Viktor Polyakov	UD	10	16 Feb 2019	Conlog Arena, Koblenz, Germany	
12	Win	12–0	(France) Yannick N'Galeu	UD	8	1 Dec 2018	Schwalbe Arena, Gummersbach, Germany	
11	Win	11–0	(Cameroon) Emmanuel Feuzeu	RTD	6 (8), 3:00	8 Sep 2018	Arena Zagreb, Zagreb, Croatia	
10	Win	10–0	(Ukraine) Serhiy Demchenko	UD	10	14 Jul 2018	Baden-Arena, Offenburg, Germany	
9	Win	9–0	(Czech Republic) Tomas Adamek	UD	8	28 Apr 2018	Baden-Arena, Offenburg, Germany	
8	Win	8–0	(France) Maurice Possiti	UD	8	17 Feb 2018	Arena Ludwigsburg, Ludwigsburg, Germany	
7	Win	7–0	(Hungary) Jozsef Racz	UD	6	3 Feb 2018	SØR Amfi, Arendal, Norway	
6	Win	6–0	(Poland) Tomasz Gargula	TKO	5 (6), 2:00	9 Sep 2017	Max-Schmeling-Halle, Berlin, Germany	
5	Win	5–0	(Hungary) Laszlo Ivanyi	KO	5 (6), 2:16	17 Jun 2017	Rittal Arena Wetzlar, Wetzlar, Germany	
4	Win	4–0	(Serbia) Slobodan Culum	TKO	2 (6), 2:44	28 Apr 2017	Armeets Arena, Sofia, Bulgaria	
3	Win	3–0	(Germany) Viktor Kessler	TKO	2 (6), 2:25	25 Mar 2017	MBS Arena, Potsdam, Germany	
2	Win	2–0	(Poland) Przemyslaw Binienda	KO	2 (6), 1:46	21 Jan 2017	Struer Arena, Struer, Denmark	
1	Win	1–0	(Croatia) Gordon Glisic	TKO	1 (6), 2:58	3 Dec 2016	Armeets Arena, Sofia, Bulgaria	

== Personal life ==
Leon Bunn is a member of Frankfurt's internationally known fight club MMA Spirit, fighting for its box club Spirit Frankfurt. If not in Berlin Bunn is coached by his father Ralph.
