= Hasan Kubilay Alcu =

Turkish boxer (born 1994)

Personal information
- Nickname: Turkish Tyson
- Born: 23 December 1994 (age 31) Istanbul, Turkey
- Height: 5 ft 8 in (173 cm)
- Weight: Light Heavyweight; Cruiserweight

Boxing career
- Reach: N/A
- Stance: Orthodox

Boxing record
- Total fights: 20
- Wins: 20
- Win by KO: 15
- Losses: 2
- Draws: 0
- No contests: 0

Hasan Kubilay Alcu (born 23 December 1994) is a Turkish professional boxer. He is the current WBA Asia East cruiserweight champion.

== Professional career ==
Alcu made his professional debut on November 7, 2020, against Rustem Astanov. Alcu won the fight via a TKO twenty seconds into the fight.

After accumulating a career record of 4–0, he faced Paata Varduashvili on September 3, 2021, for the vacant Universal Boxing Organization (UBO) Continental light heavyweight title. Alcu won the fight via a first-round TKO, winning his first career championship.

After a two fight win streak, he faced Aykhan Ismayilov on November 19, 2022, for the vacant UBO light heavyweight title. Alcu won the fight via a sixth-round corner retirement, winning his second career championship.

After another two fight win streak, he faced Ismat Eynullayev on September 17, 2023, for the vacant WBC Middle East Silver light heavyweight title. Alcu won the fight via a Unanimous Decision, winning his third career championship.

After a seven fight win streak, he faced Luciano Falcao on September 27, 2025 for the vacant WBF cruiserwieght title. Alcu won the fight via a Unanimous Decision, winning his fourth career championship.

His next fight came on July 26, 2026, against Elvin Ganbarov, which was for the vacant WBA Asia East cruiserweight title. Alcu won the fight via a fourth-round corner retirement, winning his fifth career championship.

== Professional boxing record ==
20 fights	20 wins	0 losses
By knockout	15	0
By decision	5	0

No.	Result	Record	Opponent	Type	Round, time	Date	Location	Notes
20	Win	20–0	(Azerbaijan) Elvin Ganbarov	RTD	4 (8), 3:00	26 Jul 2026	Beşkaza Square, Fethyie, Turkey	Won vacant WBA Asia East cruiserweight title
19	Win	19–0	(Brazil) Luciano Falcao	UD	12	27 Sep 2025	Orka World Hotel, Fethiye, Turkey	Won vacant WBF cruiserwieght title
18	Win	18–0	(Bolivia) Jorge David Urquiza Añez	KO	2 (10), 0:32	19 Jul 2025	Fethiye Arena, Fethiye, Turkey	
17	Win	17–0	(Indonesia) Ibrahim Aroby	TKO	1 (8), 2:17	1 Jun 2025	Taraz, Kazakhstan	
16	Win	16–0	(India) Pushpak Verma	TKO	5 (8)	12 Apr 2025	ACE Club, Cairo, Egypt	
15	Win	15–0	(Indonesia) Jamed Jalarante	RTD	1 (8), 3:00	29 Nov 2024	Biyer Event Hall, İzmir, Turkey	
14	Win	14–0	(Thailand) Yuttana Wongda	UD	6	26 Oct 2024	Singmanassak Muaythai School, Pathum Thani, Thailand	
13	Win	13–0	(Turkmenistan) Serdar Hemrayev	RTD	2 (6), 3:00	27 Apr 2024	Fethiye, Turkey	
12	Win	12–0	(Syria) Ghaith Shahadeh	RTD	5 (6), 3:00	29 Dec 2023	RSC Sports Center, Balıkesir, Turkey	
11	Win	11–0	(Azerbaijan) Ismat Eynullayev	UD	8	17 Sep 2023	Orka World Theme Park, Fethiye, Turkey	Won vacant WBC Middle East Silver light heavyweight title
10	Win	10–0	(Turkey) Sinan Güngör	UD	4	25 Aug 2023	Caferağa Sports Hall, Istanbul, Turkey	
9	Win	9–0	(Azerbaijan) Jeyhun Bashirzade	TKO	2 (4), 2:48	30 Apr 2023	Mustafa Öncel Sports Complex, Istanbul, Turkey	
8	Win	8–0	(Azerbaijan) Aykhan Ismayilov	RTD	6 (12), 3:00	19 Nov 2022	Qafqaz Sport Hotel, Baku, Azerbaijan	Won vacant UBO light heavyweight title
7	Win	7–0	(Azerbaijan) Kamran Giyaskhanov	UD	4	17 Sep 2022	Kadikoy Boks Sport Klubu, Istanbul, Turkey	
6	Win	6–0	(Uzbekistan) Sanjarbek Nasredinov	TKO	2 (6), 2:09	29 Jun 2022	Caferağa Sports Hall, Istanbul, Turkey	
5	Win	5–0	(Georgia (country)) Paata Varduashvili	TKO	1 (10), 2:55	3 Sep 2021	Kadikoy Boks Sport Klubu, Istanbul, Turkey	Won vacant UBO Continental light heavyweight title
4	Win	4–0	(Ukraine) Viktor Hnatiuk	RTD	2 (4), 3:00	19 May 2021	Pochayna Event Hall, Kyiv, Ukraine	
3	Win	3–0	(Turkmenistan) Izzat Jumakuliyev	TKO	1 (4), 1:44	25 Mar 2021	Kadikoy Boks Sport Klubu, Istanbul, Turkey	
2	Win	2–0	(Syria) Mohammad Alaya	TKO	1 (6), 0:20	10 Dec 2020	Kadikoy Boks Sport Klubu, Istanbul, Turkey	
1	Win	1–0	(Turkmenistan) Rustem Astanov	TKO	1 (4), 0:20	7 Nov 2020	Kadikoy Boks Sport Klubu, Istanbul, Turkey	
