= William Zepeda =

Mexican professional boxer (born 1996)

Personal information
- Nickname: Camaron ("Shrimp")
- Born: William Zepeda Segura; 4 June 1996 (age 30) San Mateo Atenco, Mexico
- Height: 5 ft 9 in (175 cm)
- Weight: Lightweight

Boxing career
- Reach: 69 1/2 in (177 cm)
- Stance: Southpaw

Boxing record
- Total fights: 35
- Wins: 34
- Win by KO: 27
- Losses: 1

William Zepeda Segura (born 4 June 1996) is a Mexican professional boxer, who is the reigning WBC lightweight World Champion. He challenged once for the World Boxing Council (WBC) lightweight title in 2025. He previously held the WBC interim lightweight title from 2024 to 2025.

== Professional career ==
Zepeda made his professional debut on 14 November 2015, scoring a third-round knockout (KO) victory against Alonso Salvatierra in Cabo San Lucas, Mexico.

After compiling a record of 11–0 (9 KOs), he defeated Juan Pablo Borbon via third-round corner retirement (RTD) on 25 October 2017, capturing the vacant WBF Mexican lightweight title in Metepec, Mexico. Following a technical knockout (TKO) victory in a non-title fight against Jesus Acosta in February 2018, Zepeda was scheduled to make the first defence of his title against Pedro Solís on 27 April in Culiacán, Mexico. Solís failed to weigh in below the lightweight limit at the pre-fight weigh-in, meaning he would be ineligible to contest for the title. The fight went ahead without the WBF championship at stake, and Zepeda emerged victorious via fifth-round TKO.

Following two more victories in non-title fights in the latter half of 2018–Ulises Perez via TKO in September and Maximiliano Galindo via KO in November–Zepeda won his second title on 2 March 2019, in Ciudad Acuña, Mexico, defeating Eliot Chavez via TKO in the tenth and final round to capture the vacant WBC FECARBOX Silver lightweight title. He successfully defended the title in his next fight, defeating José Rosales via TKO on 8 June 2019 in Toluca, Mexico.

After four stoppage victories in non-title fights, Zepeda faced undefeated prospect Hector Tanajara Jr. on 9 July 2021, at the Banc of California Stadium in Los Angeles, with the vacant WBA Continental Americas lightweight title on the line. Zepeda emerged victorious, capturing the vacant WBA regional title via sixth-round RTD after Tanajara's corner called a halt to the contest before the start of the seventh round. Zepeda made the first defense of his WBA title with a fourth-round knockout of John Vincent Moralde on 13 November 2021.

On 16 March 2024 in Las Vegas, Zepeda defeated Maxi Hughes via fourth-round RTD to win the WBA and IBF lightweight title eliminator.

Zepeda was scheduled to face Giovanni Cabrera at Toyota Arena in Ontario, California on 6 July 2024. Zepeda defeated Cabrera by knockout in the third round.

=== Interim WBC lightweight champion ===
==== Zepeda vs. Farmer ====
On 16 November 2024 in Riyadh, Saudi Arabia, Zepeda defeated Tevin Farmer by split decision and took the WBC interim lightweight title.

==== Zepeda vs. Farmer II ====
Zepeda successfully defended his WBC interim lightweight title in a rematch against Tevin Farmer on 29 March 2025 in Cancun, Mexico.

=== WBC lightweight championship ===
==== Zepeda vs. Stevenson ====
On 12 July 2025, at the Louis Armstrong Stadium in Queens, New York, Zepeda challenged Shakur Stevenson (23–0, 11 KOs) for his WBC lightweight title as the co-main event of "The Ring III" card. Stevenson defended his title via unanimous decision, with two judges scorecards reading 118–110, and the third scoring it 119–109.

==== Zepeda vs. Roach Jr. ====
Zepeda faced Lamont Roach Jr. for the vacant WBC lightweight title at The Theater at Virgin Hotels in Las Vegas, on August 1, 2026. He won by unanimous decision.

== Professional boxing record ==
35 fights	34 wins	1 loss
By knockout	27	0
By decision	7	1

No.	Result	Record	Opponent	Type	Round, time	Date	Location	Notes
35	Win	34–1	Lamont Roach Jr.	UD	12	1 Aug 2026	The Theater at Virgin Hotels, Paradise, Nevada, U.S.	Won vacant WBC lightweight title
34	Loss	33–1	Shakur Stevenson	UD	12	12 Jul 2025	Louis Armstrong Stadium, New York City, New York, U.S.	For WBC lightweight title
33	Win	33–0	Tevin Farmer	MD	12	29 Mar 2025	Polifórum Benito Juárez, Cancún, Mexico	Retained WBC interim lightweight title
32	Win	32–0	Tevin Farmer	SD	10	16 Nov 2024	The Venue Riyadh Season, Riyadh, Saudi Arabia	Won vacant WBC interim lightweight title
31	Win	31–0	Giovanni Cabrera	KO	3 (12), 1:58	6 Jul 2024	Toyota Arena, Ontario, California, U.S.	
30	Win	30–0	Maxi Hughes	RTD	4 (12), 3:00	16 Mar 2024	The Cosmopolitan, Paradise, Nevada, U.S.	
29	Win	29–0	Mercito Gesta	TKO	6 (12), 1:31	16 Sep 2023	Commerce Casino, Commerce, U.S.	Retained WBA Continental Americas lightweight title
28	Win	28–0	Jaime Arboleda	KO	2 (12), 2:16	29 Apr 2023	College Park Center, Arlington, U.S.	
27	Win	27–0	Joseph Diaz	UD	12	29 Oct 2022	Fantasy Springs Resort Casino, Indio, California, U.S.	
26	Win	26–0	René Alvarado	UD	10	14 May 2022	Toyota Arena, Ontario, California, U.S.	Retained WBA Continental Americas lightweight title
25	Win	25–0	Luis Angel Viedas	KO	3 (10), 1:51	19 Feb 2022	Plaza Monumental, Tijuana, Mexico	
24	Win	24–0	John Vincent Moralde	KO	4 (10), 1:59	13 Nov 2021	Honda Center, Anaheim, California, U.S.	Retained WBA Continental Americas lightweight title
23	Win	23–0	Hector Tanajara Jr.	RTD	6 (10), 3:00	9 Jul 2021	Banc of California, Los Angeles, California, U.S.	Won vacant WBA Continental Americas lightweight title
22	Win	22–0	Roberto Ramirez	KO	5 (10), 2:43	19 Nov 2020	Wild Card Gym, Los Angeles, California, U.S.	
21	Win	21–0	Brayam Rico	TKO	6 (10), 2:47	10 May 2019	Gimnasio Nuevo, Hidalgo del Parral, Mexico	
20	Win	20–0	Jampier Oses	TKO	3 (10), 2:32	26 Jan 2019	Auditorio del Estado, Mexicali, Mexico	
19	Win	19–0	Óscar Flores	RTD	2 (8), 3:00	26 Oct 2019	Plaza de Toros, Cancún, Mexico	
18	Win	18–0	José Guadalupe Rosales	TKO	8 (10), 2:53	8 Jun 2019	Unidad Deportivo Municipal San Mateo Atenco, Toluca, Mexico	Retained WBC FECARBOX Silver lightweight title
17	Win	17–0	Eliot Chávez	RTD	6 (12), 3:00	2 Mar 2019	Chaparral Disco Rodeo, Ciudad Acuña, Mexico	Won vacant WBC FECARBOX Silver lightweight title
16	Win	16–0	Maximiliano Galindo	KO	3 (8), 0:57	16 Nov 2018	Cheer's Bar, Tijuana, Mexico	
15	Win	15–0	Ulises Perez	TKO	3 (8), 1:04	1 Sep 2018	Canchas MVP, Tlaquepaque, Mexico	
14	Win	14–0	Pedro Solis Rodriguez	KO	5 (10), 2:41	27 Apr 2018	Polideportivo Juan S. Millan, Culiacán, Mexico	Retained WBF Mexican lightweight title
13	Win	13–0	Jesus Arturo Acosta	TKO	10 (10)	16 Feb 2018	Polideportivo Juan S. Millan, Culiacán, Mexico	
12	Win	12–0	Juan Pablo Borbon	RTD	3 (12), 3:00	21 Oct 2017	Metepec, Mexico	Won vacant WBF Mexican lightweight title
11	Win	11–0	Jose Manuel Castro Fierros	KO	4 (8), 1:58	24 Jun 2017	Polideportivo Centenario, Los Mochis, Mexico	
10	Win	10–0	Gabriel Gollaz Valenzuela	UD	6	25 Mar 2017	Gimnasio Usos Múltiples UdeG, Guadalajara, Mexico	
9	Win	9–0	Luis Ariel Medrano Adame	TKO	4 (8)	18 Feb 2017	Arena Pavillón de Norte, Saltillo, Mexico	
8	Win	8–0	Rogelio Manriquez	KO	2 (6), 2:19	9 Dec 2016	Gimnasio Nuevo León Unido, Monterrey, Mexico	
7	Win	7–0	Xavier Vazquez	KO	4 (6)	29 Oct 2016	Auditorio Municipal, Cabo San Lucas, Mexico	
6	Win	6–0	Juan Daniel Yllescas	TKO	3 (6), 1:54	29 Jul 2016	Gym Uribe Team, Tlalnepantla de Baz, Mexico	
5	Win	5–0	Alejandro Ramirez	KO	? (?)	2 Jul 2016	Auditorio Municipal, Cabo San Lucas, Mexico	
4	Win	4–0	Eduardo Erizmandi	UD	6	27 May 2016	Gym Uribe Team, Tlalnepantla de Baz, Mexico	
3	Win	3–0	Aldair Apolinar	KO	2 (6), 1:26	18 Mar 2016	Arena Adolfo López Mateos, Tlalnepantla de Baz, Mexico	
2	Win	2–0	Eduardo Ledezma	KO	1 (4)	13 Feb 2016	Piedras Negras, Mexico	
1	Win	1–0	Alonso Salvatierra	KO	3 (4), 2:10	14 Nov 2015	Cabo San Lucas, Mexico	

== See also ==
- List of male boxers
- List of southpaw stance boxers
- List of Mexican boxing world champions
- List of world lightweight boxing champions

Sporting positions
Regional boxing titles
New title	WBC FECARBOX Silver lightweight champion March 2, 2019 – November 16, 2024; Won interim title	Vacant
New title	WBA Continental Americas lightweight champion July 9, 2021 – November 16, 2024; Won interim title	Vacant Title next held by Nicholas Walters
World boxing titles
Vacant Title last held by Joseph Diaz	WBC lightweight champion Interim title November 16, 2024 – July 12, 2025; Lost bid for full title	Vacant Title next held by O'Shaquie Foster
Vacant Title last held by Shakur Stevenson	WBC lightweight champion August 1, 2026 – present	Incumbent
