= Malta Boxing Commission =

Professional sports organisation

The Malta Boxing Commission is an officially recognised professional boxing sanctioning organisation in Malta. Founded in 2011 by Alex Zammit and Gianluca DiCaro, the Malta Boxing Commission was inducted into the European Boxing Union at the 2011 AGM in Dublin, Ireland, but later had its membership revoked. In December 2012, former two-time, two-division champion of the world Steve Collins became the new President of the Malta Boxing Commission. In June 2014, Malta Boxing Commission was inducted by the Association of Boxing Commissions. In June 2014 the Malta Boxing Commission launched the MBC International Championship. By March 2015, Charlie Cardona was appointed chairman, with founding partner Gianluca Di Caro becoming managing director. The Malta Boxing Commission is a UK Limited Company with registered offices at West Lancashire Investment Centre, Whitemoss Business Park, Maple View, Skelmersdale, Wigan, Lancashire, WN8 9TG and San Paul il-bahar in Malta.
