= Boxing Federation of India =

Governing body for boxing

The Boxing Federation of India
- Sport: Boxing
- Jurisdiction: India
- Abbreviation: BFI
- Affiliation: World Boxing
- Regional affiliation: Asian Boxing
- President: Ajay Singh
- Secretary: Pramod Kumar

Official website
- boxingfederation.in
- (India)

Boxing Federation of India is the official national governing body for amateur boxing in India. It is a member of World Boxing. BFI is headquartered in Gurugram, Haryana.

== History ==
In 1925, the first governing body for boxing in India, Bombay Presidency Amateur Boxing Federation was formed in Mumbai. Mostly due to the efforts of H.V.Pointon, the President of the Bombay Presidency Amateur Boxing Federation (1944–48), Indian Amateur Boxing Federation was founded on 25 February 1949. Major F.G.Baker became the first secretary at the inaugural meeting at the Governor's Pavilion of the Cricket Club of India in Mumbai. Bombay (Mumbai) became the headquarters of the body. The first national championships were held at the Brabourne Stadium in Mumbai in March 1950.

Indian Boxing Federation was also known as Indian Amateur Boxing Federation (IABF) and was suspended by the International Amateur Boxing Association in 2014, following which BFI was recognised as the recognised body.

== Background ==
The IBF comprises about 6,000 registered Indian boxers and it maintains records of their personal and professional details which includes their achievements, medals won and championships participated. Registration to the IBF and possessing an identity card are mandatory for each boxer for participating in any championship organized by it.

The Indian Boxing Federation records are fully digitized. Its website is updated on a daily basis. The facility for online display of the live score of each championship conducted by it is available on its website, which is also availed by all of its affiliated state federations, boards, and units. Its website also provides information about the affiliated state federations, all registered male and female boxers and officials, coaches, and its training centers.

In November 2011 Indian Boxing Federation offered Arash Hashemi of Las Vegas, an Iranian descent and a former member of the 1996 United States of America Boxing Federation to coach the Olympic team, Hashemi rejected the tempting offer saying, "I am an Iranian/American and love my country and people. Hashemi feared they might face an Iranian or an American opponent in major tournaments. Gurbaksh Singh Sandhu, the national coach for about two decades has decided to hang his boots after the London Olympics.
