= Indian Professional Boxing Association =

National boxing institution in India

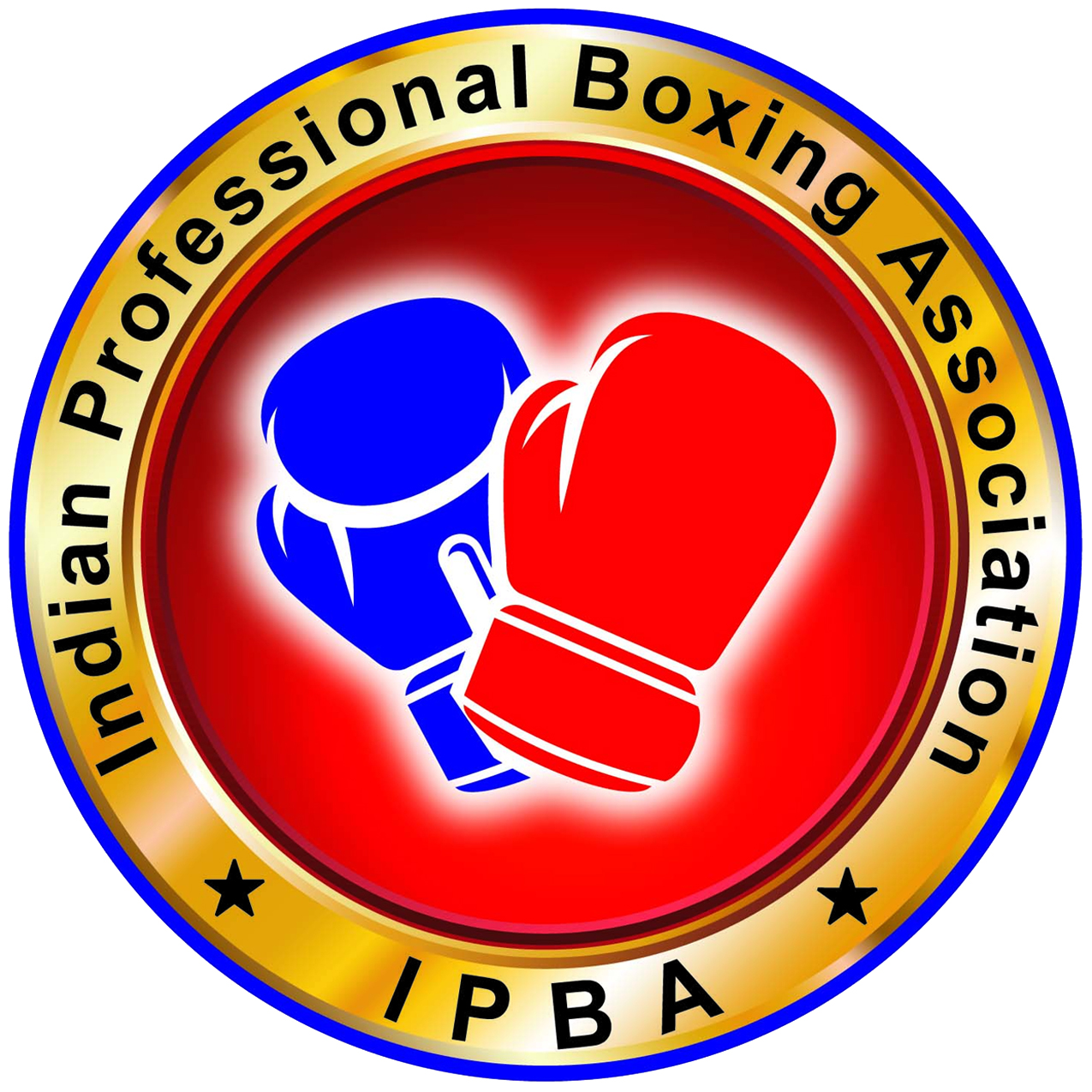
- Abbreviation: IPBA
- Formation: 2015
- Type: Non-profit Institution
- Purpose: Boxing sanctioning organization
- Headquarters: New Delhi, India
- Region served: India
- Members: WBA, WBO, IBF, APBC, EBP and WBA Asia
- President: Shahe Ali
- Main organ: General Assembly
- Website: www.ipbaboxing.com

The Indian Professional Boxing Association (Hindi: भारतीय पेशेवर मुक्केबाजी संघ) is a National Governing Body for Professional Boxing in India, which sanctions professional boxing matches and awards national and subordinate championship titles. It is headquartered in New Delhi, India.

== History ==
In 2015, IPBA - Indian Professional Boxing Association was formed in Delhi. Mr. Shahe Ali, President of the Indian Professional Boxing Association, led the efforts towards its formation. With the establishment of IPBA, a strong attempt has been made to bring back attention to the sport.

IPBA is a 'Not for Profit’ organization registered as a Section 8 Company with the Ministry of Corporate Affairs, Government of India. The aim and endeavours of IPBA are geared towards bringing the sport of boxing in India at par with other popular sports.

== Overview ==
In India, boxing does not have a large fan base, which is often attributed to the lack of discernible international exposure. However, despite Indian limited success in global championships events, athletes have regularly won medals at the Asian and Commonwealth Games. Since the first national boxing championship in 1950, India has not until 2015 established any platform for professional boxers. After a long wait of 65 Years, India is stepping into Professional Boxing.

A key desire of IPBA is to make the transition of Indian athletes from amateur boxing to the world of professional boxing a painless affair. IPBA would also manage and promote professional boxing at national level in India and would ensure Indian professionals make their presence felt at the international level as well. IPBA wants the world to see India as a premier breeding ground of power sports in the world of sports.

== Affiliations ==
The Indian Professional Boxing Association is affiliated and member organization of the World Boxing Association, World Boxing Organization, International Boxing Federation, Association of Professional Boxing Commissions, Eurasian Boxing Parliament and WBA Asia Boxing Association.

- World Boxing Association
- World Boxing Organization
- International Boxing Federation
- Association of Professional Boxing Commissions
- Eurasian Boxing Parliament
- WBA Asia

== People associated ==
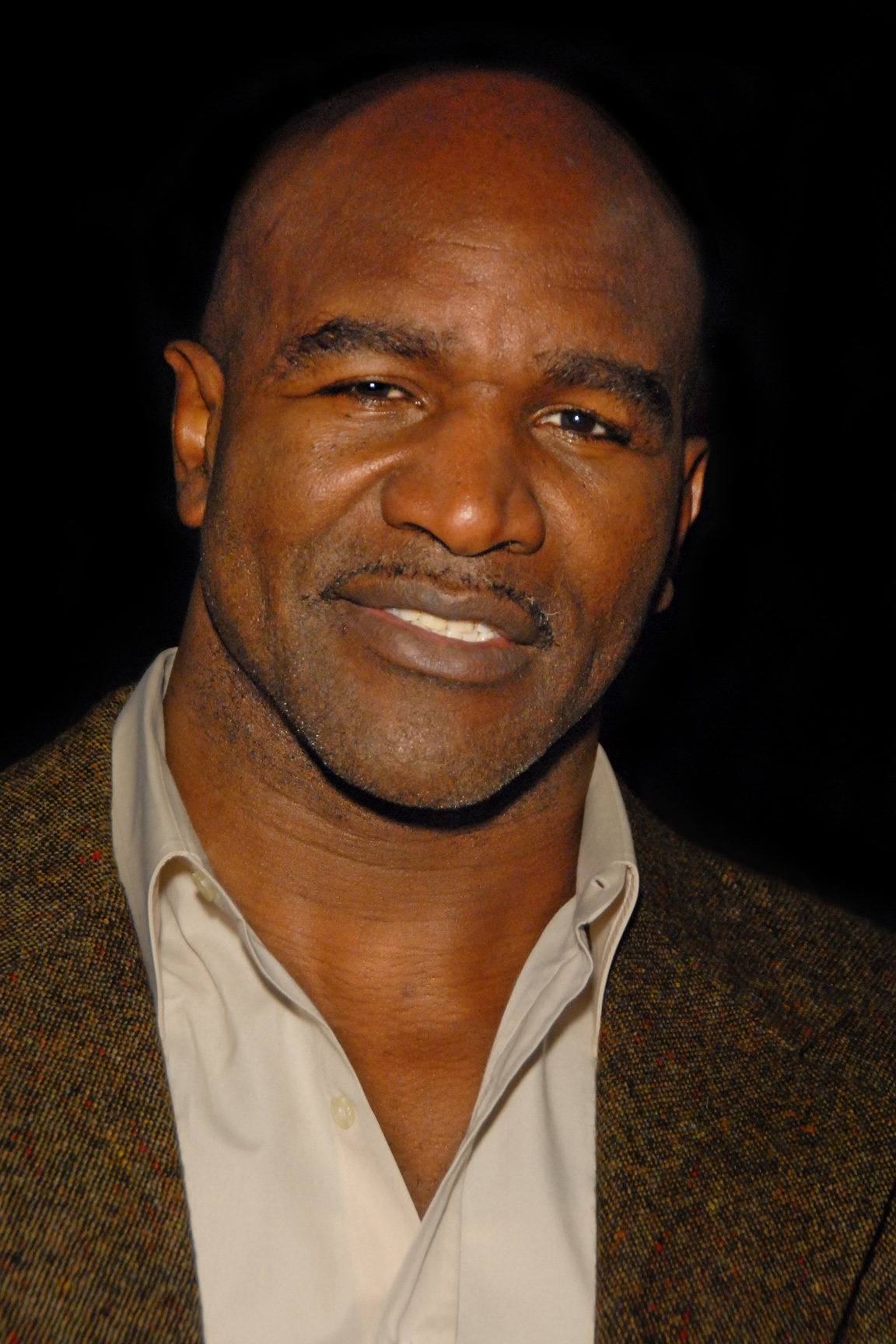
Evander Holyfield associated with IPBA to promote boxing in India

- Evander Holyfield is associated with IPBA to promote professional boxing in India.
- S. M. Khan - Director General (Press Registrar and Head of Department), Registrar of Newspapers for India.
- Immanuel Ndapewa Paulus - Imms Moses
