= 2015 AIBA World Boxing Championships – Bantamweight =

Boxing competitions

The Bantamweight competition at the 2015 AIBA World Boxing Championships will be held from 6–14 October 2015. This is a qualifying tournament for the upcoming 2016 Summer Olympics. Michael Conlan of Ireland defeated Murodjon Akhmadaliev of Uzbekistan to win the world title.

== Medalists ==
Gold	Michael Conlan (IRL)
Silver	Murodjon Akhmadaliev (UZB)
Bronze	Shiva Thapa (IND)
Bronze	Dzmitry Asanau (BLR)

== Seeds ==
1. (Kazakhstan) Kairat Yeraliyev (round of 16)
2. (Cuba) Andy Cruz Gómez (Quarter final)
3. (Republic of Ireland) Michael Conlan
4. (Qatar) Hakan Erseker (Quarter final)

== Draw ==
=== Finals ===
Semifinals
1	Murodjon Akhmadaliev (UZB)	3
4	Shiva Thapa (IND)	0
3	Michael Conlan (IRL)	3
2	Dzmitry Asanau (BLR)	0

Final
Murodjon Akhmadaliev (UZB)	0
Michael Conlan (IRL)	3

==== Section 1 ====
Round of 32
Francesco Maietta (ITA)	0
Murodjon Akhmadaliev (UZB)	3
Chatchai Butdee (THA)	3
Mykola Butsenko (UKR)	0
Frederik Jensen (DEN)	3
Tafari Ebanks (CAY)	0
Khalil Litim (ALG)	1
Shiva Thapa (IND)	2
Boe Warawara (VAN)	3
Yakub Meredov (TKM)	0

Round of 16
Kairat Yeraliyev (KAZ)	0
Murodjon Akhmadaliev (UZB)	3
Chatchai Butdee (THA)	3
Frederik Jensen (DEN)	0
Mohamed Hamout (MAR)
Shiva Thapa (IND)	KO
Boe Warawara (VAN)	1
Hakan Erseker (QAT)	2

Quarterfinals
Murodjon Akhmadaliev (UZB)	3
Chatchai Butdee (THA)	0
Shiva Thapa (IND)	3
Hakan Erseker (QAT)	0

Semifinals
Murodjon Akhmadaliev (UZB)	3
Shiva Thapa (IND)	0

==== Section 2 ====
Round of 32
Robenílson Vieira (BRA)	3
Jayden Hansen (AUS)	0
Enkhjargalyn Iderkhüü (MGL)	2
José Díaz Azocar (VEN)	1
Aram Avagyan (ARM)	0
Dzmitry Asanau (BLR)	3
Rogers Semitala (UGA)	0
Segundo Padilla Bennet (ECU)	3
Qais Ashfaq (GBR)	1
Bakhtovar Nazirov (RUS)	2

Round of 16
Michael Conlan (IRL)	2
Robenilson Vieira (BRA)	0
Enkhjargalyn Iderkhüü (MGL)	0
Tayfur Aliyev (AZE)	3
Dzmitry Asanau (BLR)	3
Segundo Padilla Bennet (ECU)	0
Bakhtovar Nazirov (RUS)	1
Andy Cruz Gómez (CUB)	2

Quarterfinals
Michael Conlan (IRL)	3
Tayfur Aliyev (AZE)	0
Dzmitry Asanau (BLR)	3
Andy Cruz Gómez (CUB)	0

Semifinals
Michael Conlan (IRL)	3
Dzmitry Asanau (BLR)	0

== Results ==
=== Ranking ===
Rank	Athlete
1st place, gold medalist(s)	Michael Conlan (IRL)
2nd place, silver medalist(s)	Murodjon Akhmadaliev (UZB)
3rd place, bronze medalist(s)	Shiva Thapa (IND)
3rd place, bronze medalist(s)	Dzmitry Asanau (BLR)
5	Chatchai Butdee (THA)
5	Hakan Erseker (QAT)
5	Tayfur Aliyev (AZE)
5	Andy Cruz Gómez (CUB)
9	Robenilson Vieira (BRA)
9	Frederik Jensen (DEN)
9	Segundo Padilla Bennet (ECU)
9	Kairat Yeraliyev (KAZ)
9	Iderkhuu Enkhjargncl (MGL)
9	Mohamed Hamout (MAR)
9	Bakhtovar Nazirov (RUS)
9	Boe Warawara (VAN)
17	Khalil Litim (ALG)
17	Aram Avagyan (ARM)
17	Jayden Hansen (AUS)
17	Tafari Ebanks (CAY)
17	Qais Ashfaq (GBR)
17	Francesco Maietta (ITA)
17	Yakub Meredov (TKM)
17	Rogers Semitala (UGA)
17	Mykola Butsenko (UKR)
17	José Díaz Azocar (VEN)
