= 2013 AIBA World Boxing Championships – Bantamweight =

Boxing competitions

The Bantamweight competition at the 2013 AIBA World Boxing Championships was held from 17–26 October 2013. Boxers were limited to a maximum of 56 kilograms in body mass.

== Medalists ==
Gold	Javid Chalabiyev (AZE)
Silver	Vladimir Nikitin (RUS)
Bronze	Kairat Yeraliyev (KAZ)
Bronze	Mykola Butsenko (UKR)

== Seeds ==
1. (Cuba) Robeisy Ramírez (quarterfinals)
2. (Republic of Ireland) Michael Conlan (quarterfinals)
3. (Brazil) Robenílson Vieira (third round)
4. (India) Shiva Thapa (quarterfinals)
5. (Mongolia) Nyambayaryn Tögstsogt (second round)
6. (Ukraine) Mykola Butsenko (semifinals)
7. (Moldova) Veaceslav Gojan (third round)
8. (Kazakhstan) Kairat Yeraliyev (semifinals)
9. (Kyrgyzstan) Omurbek Malabekov (third round)
10. (Russia) Vladimir Nikitin (final)

== Draw ==
=== Finals ===
Semifinals
1	(Kazakhstan) Kairat Yeraliyev	1
4	(Azerbaijan) Javid Chalabiyev	2
3	(Ukraine) Mykola Butsenko	1
2	(Russia) Vladimir Nikitin	2

Final
(Azerbaijan) Javid Chalabiyev	3
(Russia) Vladimir Nikitin	0

=== Top half ===
==== Section 1 ====
First Round
(Germany) Edgar Walth	0
(China) Zhang Jiawei	3
(England) Gamal Yafai	0
(Armenia) Aram Avagyan	3
(Georgia (country)) Avtandil Chubabria	0
(Italy) Vittorio Parrinello	3
(Nepal) Dinesh Shrestha	0
(Uzbekistan) Shakhriyor Isakov	3
(Canada) Tanjit Lally	0
(Romania) Nicolae Andreiana	3

Second Round
(Cuba) Robeisy Ramírez	3
(China) Zhang Jiawei	0
(Armenia) Aram Avagyan	3
(Italy) Vittorio Parrinello	0
(Kyrgyzstan) Omurbek Malabekov	2
(Uzbekistan) Shakhriyor Isakov	1
(Romania) Nicolae Andreiana	0
(Kazakhstan) Kairat Yeraliyev	3

Third Round
(Cuba) Robeisy Ramírez	3
(Armenia) Aram Avagyan	0
(Kyrgyzstan) Omurbek Malabekov	1
(Kazakhstan) Kairat Yeraliyev	2

Quarterfinals
(Cuba) Robeisy Ramírez	0
(Kazakhstan) Kairat Yeraliyev	3

==== Section 2 ====
First Round
(Azerbaijan) Javid Chalabiyev	2
(Tajikistan) Oraz Avzalshoev	1
(Venezuela) Yoni Pacheco	3
(Wales) Sean McGoldrick	0
(North Korea) Kim Myong-Il	3
(Angola) Pedro Gomes	0
(Guyana) Imran Khan	0
(Philippines) Mario Fernandez	3

Second Round
(Mongolia) Nyambayaryn Tögstsogt	1
(Azerbaijan) Javid Chalabiyev	2
(Venezuela) Yoni Pacheco	0
(Kenya) Benson Gicharu	3
(Argentina) Alberto Melián	3
(North Korea) Kim Myong-Il	0
(Philippines) Mario Fernandez	0
(India) Shiva Thapa	3

Third Round
(Azerbaijan) Javid Chalabiyev	2
(Kenya) Benson Gicharu	1
(Argentina) Alberto Melián	1
(India) Shiva Thapa	2

Quarterfinals
(Azerbaijan) Javid Chalabiyev	3
(India) Shiva Thapa	0

=== Bottom half ===
==== Section 3 ====
First Round
(Algeria) Reda Benbaziz	3
(Nigeria) Sikiru Ojo	0
(Turkey) Selçuk Eker	3
(United States) Eduardo Castellon	0
(Finland) Matti Koota	3
(Sri Lanka) Gayan Naiduralage	0
(Latvia) Dmitrijs Gutmans	0
(Thailand) Donchai Thathi	3
(Scotland) Joe Ham	3
(Turkmenistan) Yakub Meredov	0

Second Round
(Brazil) Robenílson Vieira	3
(Algeria) Reda Benbaziz	0
(Turkey) Selçuk Eker	3
(Finland) Matti Koota	0
(Japan) Kenji Fujita	1
(Thailand) Donchai Thathi	2
(Scotland) Joe Ham	0
(Ukraine) Mykola Butsenko	3

Third Round
(Brazil) Robenílson Vieira	1
(Turkey) Selçuk Eker	2
(Thailand) Donchai Thathi	1
(Ukraine) Mykola Butsenko	2

Quarterfinals
(Turkey) Selçuk Eker	1
(Ukraine) Mykola Butsenko	2

==== Section 4 ====
First Round
(Bhutan) Phub Sigyel	3
(Belarus) Dzmitry Sapon	0
(Guatemala) Juan Donis	TKO
(Pakistan) Nadir Baloch
(Bulgaria) Stefan Ivanov	2
(Australia) Jackson Woods	1
(Cayman Islands) Tafari Ebanks	0
(Mexico) Brian González	3
(Egypt) Hesham Yehia	1
(Hungary) Krisztián Nagy	2

Second Round
(Moldova) Veaceslav Gojan	3
(Bhutan) Phub Sigyel	0
(Guatemala) Juan Donis	0
(Russia) Vladimir Nikitin	3
(Bulgaria) Stefan Ivanov	1
(Mexico) Brian González	2
(Hungary) Krisztián Nagy	0
(Republic of Ireland) Michael Conlan	3

Third Round
(Moldova) Veaceslav Gojan	0
(Russia) Vladimir Nikitin	3
(Mexico) Brian González	0
(Republic of Ireland) Michael Conlan	3

Quarterfinals
(Russia) Vladimir Nikitin	3
(Republic of Ireland) Michael Conlan	0
