= Boxing at the 2016 Summer Olympics – Men's bantamweight =

Men's bantamweight boxing at the Games of the XXXI Olympiad
- Venue: Riocentro – Pavilion 6
- Date: 10–20 August 2016
- Competitors: 28 from 28 nations

Medalists
1st place, gold medalist(s)		Robeisy Ramírez	Cuba
2nd place, silver medalist(s)		Shakur Stevenson	United States
3rd place, bronze medalist(s)		Vladimir Nikitin	Russia
3rd place, bronze medalist(s)		Murodjon Akhmadaliev	Uzbekistan

The men's bantamweight boxing competition at the 2016 Summer Olympics in Rio de Janeiro was held from 10 to 20 August at the Riocentro.

== Competition format ==
Like all Olympic boxing events, the competition was a straight single-elimination tournament. This event consisted of 28 boxers who had qualified for the competition through various qualifying tournaments held in 2015 and 2016. The 2016 medal competition began with a preliminary round on 10 August, where the number of competitors was reduced to 16, and concluded with the final on 20 August. As there were fewer than 32 boxers in the competition, a number of boxers received a bye through the preliminary round. Both semi-final losers were awarded bronze medals.

== Schedule ==
All times are Brasília Time (UTC−3).

Date	Time	Round
Wednesday, 10 August 2016	11:30 & 17:30	Round of 32
Thursday, 11 August 2016	11:00 & 17:00	Round of 32
Sunday, 14 August 2016	11:30 & 17:30	Round of 16
Tuesday, 16 August 2016	11:30	Quarterfinals
Thursday, 18 August 2016	14:30	Semifinals
Saturday, 20 August 2016	14:15	Final

== Results ==
=== Finals ===
Semi-finals
Vladimir Nikitin (RUS)
Shakur Stevenson (USA)	WO
Robeisy Ramírez (CUB)	3
Murodjon Akhmadaliev (UZB)	0

Final
Shakur Stevenson (USA)	1
Robeisy Ramírez (CUB)	2

Nikitin withdrew due an injury sustained in the fight against Conlan.

=== Top half ===
Round of 32
Aram Avagyan (ARM)	2
Arashi Morisaka (JPN)	1
Qais Ashfaq (GBR)	0
Chatchai Butdee (THA)	3
Lionel Warawara (VAN)	0
Vladimir Nikitin (RUS)	3
Dzmitry Asanau (BLR)	2
Héctor García (DOM)	1
Benson Gicharu (KEN)	0
Erdenebatyn Tsendbaatar (MGL)	3
Robenílson de Jesus (BRA)	2
Fahem Hammachi (ALG)	1

Round of 16
Michael Conlan (IRL)	3
Aram Avagyan (ARM)	0
Chatchai Butdee (THA)	1
Vladimir Nikitin (RUS)	2
Dzmitry Asanau (BLR)	1
Erdenebatyn Tsendbaatar (MGL)	2
Robenílson de Jesus (BRA)	0
Shakur Stevenson (USA)	3

Quarter-finals
Michael Conlan (IRL)	1
Vladimir Nikitin (RUS)	2
Erdenebatyn Tsendbaatar (MGL)	0
Shakur Stevenson (USA)	3

Semi-finals
Vladimir Nikitin (RUS)
Shakur Stevenson (USA)	WO

=== Bottom half ===
Round of 32
Víctor Rodríguez (VEN)	1
Ham Sang-myeong (KOR)	2
Mykola Butsenko (UKR)	0
Mohamed Hamout (MAR)	2
Shiva Thapa (IND)	0
Robeisy Ramírez (CUB)	3
Alberto Melián (ARG)	3
Abdul Omar (GHA)	0
Bilel Mhamdi (TUN)	3
Inkululeko Suntele (LES)	0
Javid Chalabiyev (AZE)	1
Kairat Yeraliyev (KAZ)	2

Round of 16
Zhang Jiawei (CHN)	3
Ham Sang-myeong (KOR)	0
Mohamed Hamout (MAR)	1
Robeisy Ramírez (CUB)	2
Alberto Melián (ARG)	3
Bilel Mhamdi (TUN)	0
Kairat Yeraliyev (KAZ)	0
Murodjon Akhmadaliev (UZB)	3

Quarter-finals
Zhang Jiawei (CHN)	0
Robeisy Ramírez (CUB)	3
Alberto Melián (ARG)
Murodjon Akhmadaliev (UZB)	TKO

Semi-finals
Robeisy Ramírez (CUB)	3
Murodjon Akhmadaliev (UZB)	0
