= 2017 AIBA World Boxing Championships – Bantamweight =

Boxing competitions

Bantamweight at the 2017 AIBA World Boxing Championships
- Venue: Alsterdorfer Sporthalle
- Location: Hamburg, Germany
- Dates: 25 August–2 September
- Competitors: 28 from 28 nations

Medalists
gold medal	Kairat Yeraliyev	Kazakhstan
silver medal	Duke Ragan	United States
bronze medal	Peter McGrail	England
bronze medal	Gaurav Bidhuri	India

The Bantamweight competition at the 2017 AIBA World Boxing Championships was held from 25 August to 2 September 2017.

== Draw ==
=== Final ===
Final
2 September
(Kazakhstan) Kairat Yeraliyev	3
(United States) Duke Ragan	2

=== Top half ===
First round
25 August
(Mexico) Christopher Florez	0
(Kazakhstan) Kairat Yeraliyev	5
25 August
(Denmark) Ahmed El Ahmad	0
(Japan) Ryomei Tanaka	5
25 August
(Spain) José Quiles	0
(Germany) Omar El-Hag	5
25 August
(Dominican Republic) Leonel de los Santos	4
(Republic of Ireland) Kurt Walker	1
25 August
(South Korea) Han Young-hun	1
(Italy) Raffaele Di Serio	4
25 August
(Nicaragua) Angel Jarquin	KO
(Uganda) Geofrey Kaketo

Second round
27 August
(Uzbekistan) Murodjon Akhmadaliev	1
(Kazakhstan) Kairat Yeraliyev	4
27 August
(Japan) Ryomei Tanaka	2
(Germany) Omar El-Hag	3
27 August
(Dominican Republic) Leonel de los Santos	3
(Italy) Raffaele Di Serio	2
27 August
(Nicaragua) Angel Jarquin	0
(England) Peter McGrail	5

Quarterfinals
29 August
(Kazakhstan) Kairat Yeraliyev	5
(Germany) Omar El-Hag	0
29 August
(Dominican Republic) Leonel de los Santos	1
(England) Peter McGrail	4

Semifinals
31 August
(Kazakhstan) Kairat Yeraliyev	5
(England) Peter McGrail	0

=== Bottom half ===
First round
25 August
(Tunisia) Bilel Mhamdi	5
(Chinese Taipei) Kao Shih-yen	0
25 August
(India) Gaurav Bidhuri	5
(Australia) Sam Goodman	0
25 August
(Ukraine) Mykola Butsenko	5
(Mauritius) Jordy Vadamootoo	0
25 August
(Cuba) Javier Ibáñez	1
(United States) Duke Ragan	4
25 August
(Vanuatu) Lionel Warawara	1
(Scotland) Lee McGregor	4
25 August
(Bulgaria) Stefan Ivanov	5
(Cape Verde) Gerson Silva	0

Second round
27 August
(Argentina) Alberto Melián	0
(Tunisia) Bilel Mhamdi	5
27 August
(India) Gaurav Bidhuri	4
(Ukraine) Mykola Butsenko	1
27 August
(United States) Duke Ragan	5
(Scotland) Lee McGregor	0
27 August
(Bulgaria) Stefan Ivanov	0
(China) Zhang Jiawei	5

Quarterfinals
29 August
(Tunisia) Bilel Mhamdi	0
(India) Gaurav Bidhuri	3
29 August
(United States) Duke Ragan	5
(China) Zhang Jiawei	0

Semifinals
31 August
(India) Gaurav Bidhuri	0
(United States) Duke Ragan	5
