= Michael Conlan (boxer) =

Irish boxer (born 1991)

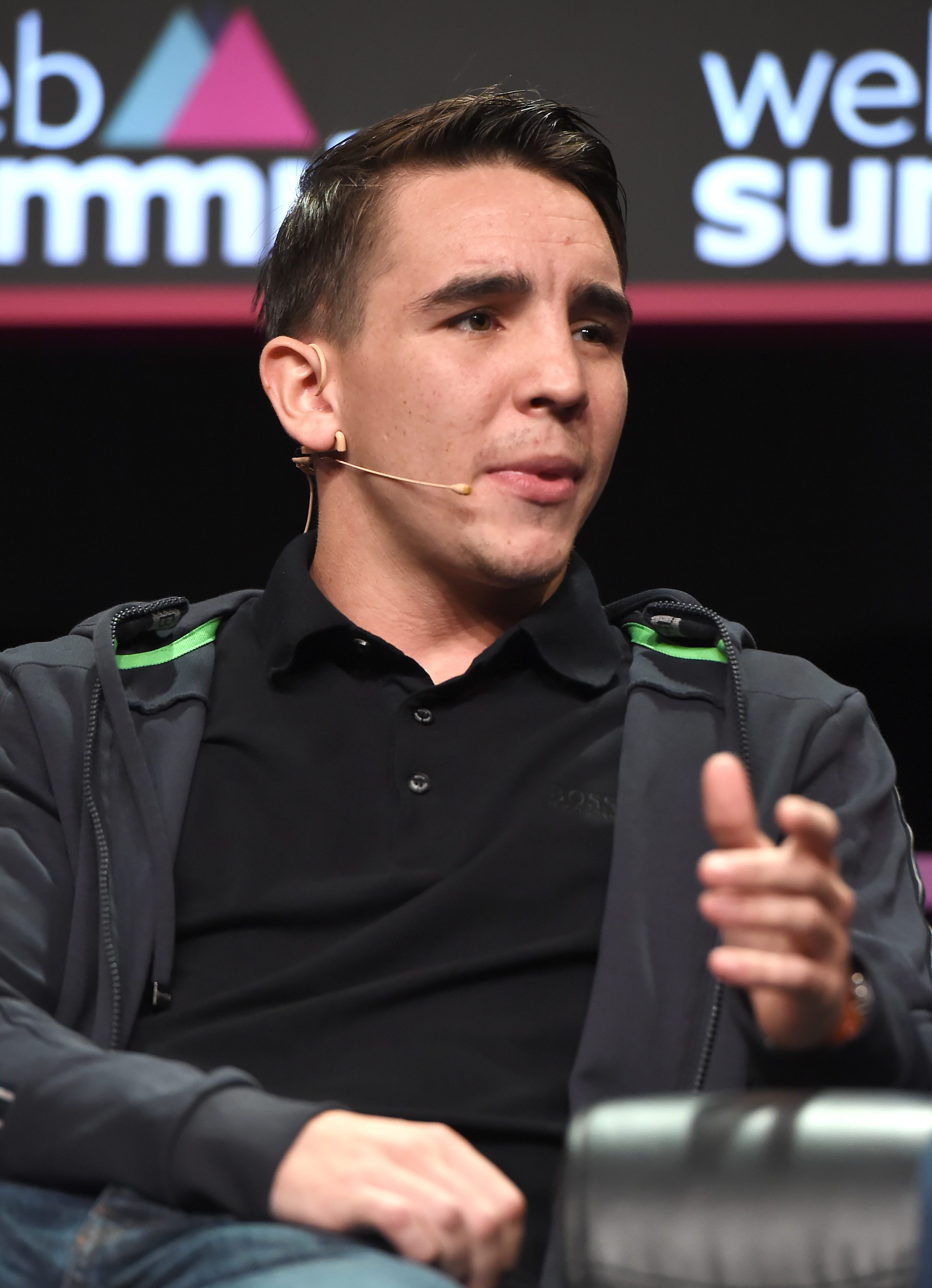
- Conlan at Web Summit in Dublin, 2015

Personal information
- Nickname: Mick
- Nationality: Irish
- Born: 19 November 1991 (age 34) Belfast, Northern Ireland
- Height: 5 ft 8 in (173 cm)
- Weight: Super bantamweight; Featherweight; Super featherweight

Boxing career
- Reach: 69 in (175 cm)
- Stance: Southpaw

Boxing record
- Total fights: 24
- Wins: 20
- Win by KO: 10
- Losses: 4
Medal record
Representing Ireland
Olympic Games
| Bronze medal – third place | 2012 London | Flyweight |
World Amateur Championships
| Gold medal – first place | 2015 Doha | Bantamweight |
European Amateur Championships
| Gold medal – first place | 2015 Samokov | Bantamweight |
| Silver medal – second place | 2013 Minsk | Flyweight |
Representing Northern Ireland
Commonwealth Games
| Gold medal – first place | 2014 Glasgow | Bantamweight |

Michael John Conlan (born 19 November 1991) is an Irish former professional boxer from Northern Ireland.

A world, European, and Commonwealth champion (representing Northern Ireland at the latter), and an Olympic bronze medallist, Conlan turned professional in 2016 after a controversial loss at the 2016 Olympic Games. He was RTÉ Sports Person of the Year in 2015.

== Early life ==
Michael John Conlan was born on 19 November 1991 in Belfast, Northern Ireland. His father and coach, John, hails from Drimnagh, Dublin. His elder brother, Jamie, was also a professional boxer.

== Amateur career ==
=== Domestic ===
Conlan won his first Ulster novice title at the age of 11, and is a three-time Irish national flyweight champion.

=== International competition ===
In his debut match at the 2012 Olympics, he defeated Ghanaian boxer Duke Micah, having received a bye in the first round. In the quarter final, he defeated French boxer Nordine Oubaali by 22–18, guaranteeing himself a bronze medal. Conlan lost his semi-final bout against Cuba's eventual gold medallist Robeisy Ramírez.

Conlan won a silver medal at the 2013 European Championships in Minsk, losing to Welsh boxer Andrew Selby by 1:2.

=== Commonwealth and European champion ===
Conlan moved up from flyweight to bantamweight and on 2 August 2014 won the gold medal at the 2014 Commonwealth Games in Glasgow, beating England's Qais Ashfaq. Conlan won despite only returning to training two weeks prior following an injury.

2015 started off with Conlan competing in the World Series of Boxing for Italia Thunder. Conlan and his teammate, fellow Irish boxer Paddy Barnes, would compete in seven fights over 14 weeks in an effort to try and secure qualification for the 2016 Olympics in Rio de Janeiro. Conlan racked up five wins out of seven, which was just enough for him to finish second in the individual ranking and secure an Olympic berth in Rio.

In August 2015 Conlan won the European Championships at bantamweight and scooped Boxer of the Tournament. He competed in four fights beating; French, Danish, Italian and Great Britain representatives. He only lost 3 rounds out of a possible 36 on individual judges' scorecards. His final was a repeat of the 2014 Commonwealth Games final against Great Britain's Qais Ashfaq. Conlan took the first in what was a very technical encounter, the Belfast man took the second on a split, by the third round the No.1 seed (Conlan) was in cruise control which saw him take the round and the fight unanimously to retain Ireland's hold on the European bantamweight title and the best boxer award (both of which John Joe Nevin won in 2013).

=== World champion ===
In October 2015, Conlan won the gold medal in the bantamweight division at the 2015 World Championships. It was Ireland's first ever male World Championship gold medal. In December 2015, Conlan was named as the RTÉ Sports Person of the Year for 2015.

=== 2016 Olympics ===
In the 2016 Olympic Games in Rio de Janeiro, Conlan endured "daylight robbery" by losing his quarter-final on a "truly awful verdict to a blood-spattered Russian" Vladimir Nikitin. Conlan protested in the ring and said that he had been "robbed" of his Olympic dream. The Russian subsequently withdrew from his semi-final due to the seriousness of injuries inflicted by Conlan.

=== 2012 Summer Olympics ===
Won bronze in the 2012 Summer Olympics at flyweight. Results were:

- (Ghana) Duke Micah: Won (19:8)
- (France) Nordine Oubaali: Won (22:18)
- (Cuba) Robeisy Ramírez: Lost (20:10)

=== 2013 European Championships ===
Won silver in the 2013 European Championships at flyweight. Results were:

- (Armenia) Narek Abgaryan: Won (3:0)
- (Belarus) Siarhej Loban: Won (TKO 2)
- (Russia) Ovik Oganisyan: Won (2:1)
- (Wales) Andrew Selby: Lost (1:2)

=== 2014 Commonwealth Games ===
Conlan won Gold in the Commonwealth Games at bantamweight. Results were:

- (Nauru) Matthew Martin: Won (3:0)
- (India) Shiva Thapa: Won (3:0)
- (Uganda) Bashir Nassir: Won (3:0)
- (Wales) Sean McGoldrick: Won (3:0)
- (England) Qais Ashfaq: Won (3:0)

=== 2015 European Championships ===
Conlan won Gold in the European Championships at bantamweight. Results were:

- (France) Anthony Bret: Won (3:0)
- (Denmark) Frederik Lundgaard Jensen: Won (3:0)
- (Italy) Francesco Maietta: Won (3:0)
- (United Kingdom) Qais Ashfaq: Won (3:0)

=== 2015 World Championships ===
Conlan won Gold in the World Championships at bantamweight. Results were:

- (Brazil) Robenílson Vieira: Won (2:1)
- (Azerbaijan) Tayfur Aliyev: Won (3:0)
- (Belarus) Dzmitry Asanau: Won (3:0)
- (Uzbekistan) Murodjon Akhmadaliev: Won (3:0)

=== 2016 Summer Olympics ===
Conlan lost at the quarter-finals stage in the 2016 Summer Olympics at bantamweight. Results were:

- (Armenia) Aram Avagyan: Won (3:0)
- (Russia) Vladimir Nikitin: Lost (1:2)

== Professional career ==
Following the 2016 Olympics and his disillusionment with amateur boxing, Conlan reaffirmed his intentions of turning professional. Despite interest from several big promotions and rumours of a deal being struck with Mayweather Promotions, it was Top Rank who secured Conlan's signature. On 23 September, Bob Arum confirmed that Conlan would be making his professional debut at The Theater at Madison Square Garden, on St. Patrick's Day.

On 17 March 2017, Conlan won his first fight as a professional boxer, beating Tim Ibarra by a third round technical knockout (TKO) at the theatre at Madison Square Garden.

On 3 August 2019, he fought Diego Alberto Ruiz. In front of a packed crowd in his hometown Belfast, Conlan continued his unbeaten streak in the pros and stopped his opponent in nine rounds.

On 14 December, Conlan faced Vladimir Nikitin. It was a much anticipated bout, since Nikitin beat Conlan twice in the amateurs, including once at the Rio Olympics in 2016. Conlan won comfortably on all three scorecards, 100–90, 99–91 and 98–92.

In his next fight, Conlan squared off against Sofiane Takoucht. Conlan started the fight fast, and was dominant throughout most of the fight, assaulting Takoucht with numerous body shots. Some of Conlan's body shots were landing below the belt, for which he was deducted a point on two occasions. In the tenth round, Conlan was just too much for the Frenchman, and the referee stopped the fight, awarding Conlan the tenth-round TKO win.

Conlan won his first bout at the super-bantam weight level on 30 April 2021, beating Ionut Baluta by a majority decision.

Conlan returned to featherweight in his next bout, as he faced T. J. Doheny for the vacant WBA interim featherweight title on 6 August 2021. Conlan won the fight by unanimous decision, with two judges scoring the fight 116–111 in his favor, while the third judge scored it 119–108 for him. He scored the sole knockdown of the bout in the fifth round, dropping Doheny with a strike to the body.

Conlan remained in the featherweight level for his fight against Leigh Wood, the current WBA (Regular) featherweight title holder, on 12 March 2022. He started the fight brightly, scoring a knockdown on Wood in the first round and he continued to dominate until the later rounds when Wood came back into the contest more. Conlan went down in the 11th round, it was scored as a knockdown despite protests from Conlan's corner. In the 12th, with Conlan just being ahead on all the scorecards, Wood improved again and 1:25 into the round he knocked out Conlan, with Conlan falling through the ropes and reportedly being rendered unconscious for "a minute or two". He was quickly taken to hospital, Conlan since has said he is "all good" and his scans were "clear".

On 6 August 2022, Conlan made his ring return at SSE Arena Belfast in Belfast, Northern Ireland. He faced three-time world title challenger Miguel Marriaga of Colombia. He won the fight by unanimous decision, scoring three knockdowns in round seven, eight and nine.

At the same venue, he stopped Karim Guerfi in the first round on 10 December 2022, before suffering a fifth round technical knockout defeat against IBF featherweight champion Luis Alberto Lopez on 27 May 2023.

Fighting at the SSE in Belfast for the fourth successive occasion, Conlan faced Jordan Gill for the vacant WBA International super-featherweight title on 2 December 2023, but lost via stoppage in the seventh round.

After 15 months away from the competitive boxing ring, he returned with a points win over Asad Asif Khan in an eight-round contest at the Brighton Centre in Brighton on 7 March 2025.

At the 3Arena in Dublin on 5 September 2025, Conlan defeated Jack Bateson by technical knockout in the fourth round to win the vacant WBC International featherweight title.

He made the first defense of his title against undefeated Kevin Walsh at the SSE Arena in Belfast on 20 March 2026. Conlan lost by split decision with the judges' scorecards reading 97–93, 94–96 and 94–96. He announced his retirement from professional boxing immediately after the fight.

== Controversy ==
=== 2016 Summer Olympics boxing ===
In the men's bantamweight quarterfinal stage of the 2016 Summer Olympics in Rio de Janeiro, Conlan was eliminated by a controversial call, in which Russia's Vladimir Nikitin was awarded the victory. Conlan reacted by raising his middle finger at the judges and delivering a strongly-worded live television interview to RTÉ, accusing officials in amateur boxing of corruption. That decision was one of a number that had fellow international boxers and commentators questioning the integrity of Olympic boxing and the scoring system used.

Conlan was found placing bets on boxing events at the 2016 Summer Olympics, violating the IOC rules. Accordingly, he was sanctioned with a severe reprimand by the Disciplinary Commission of the IOC.

=== Pro Irish Republican 'ring walk' ===
In his eleventh professional bout, Conlan arrived in Madison Square Garden with The Wolfe Tones' song Celtic Symphony playing and some of the crowd chanting "Ooh ahh, up the 'Ra". Some, including Northern Irish former world champion Dave McAuley, called for action from boxing regulatory bodies. The niece of an IRA bombing victim suggested that Conlan had "glorified terrorism" and criticised the boxer by suggesting he was the antithesis of other boxers like Barry McGuigan and Carl Frampton who had always strived to keep a cross-community spirit in boxing. Promoter Barney Eastwood echoed McAuley's sentiment, saying it "should never have been allowed to come about". Politicians and boxing coach John Breen also suggested that Conlan will have lost support because of it. Conlan subsequently apologised for his "misjudgement" in using Celtic Symphony as his ring-walk music.

== Professional boxing record ==
| 24 fights | 20 wins | 4 losses |
|---|---|---|
| By knockout | 10 | 3 |
| By decision | 10 | 1 |

| No. | Result | Record | Opponent | Type | Round, time | Date | Location | Notes |
|---|---|---|---|---|---|---|---|---|
| 24 | Loss | 20–4 | Kevin Walsh | SD | 10 | 20 Mar 2026 | SSE Arena, Belfast, Northern Ireland | Lost WBC International featherweight title |
| 23 | Win | 20–3 | Jack Bateson | TKO | 4 (10), 2:50 | 5 Sep 2025 | 3Arena, Dublin, Ireland | Won vacant WBC International featherweight title |
| 22 | Win | 19–3 | Asad Asif Khan | PTS | 8 | 7 Mar 2025 | Brighton Centre, Brighton, England | |
| 21 | Loss | 18–3 | Jordan Gill | TKO | 7 (12), 1:09 | 2 Dec 2023 | SSE Arena, Belfast, Northern Ireland | For vacant WBA International super-featherweight title |
| 20 | Loss | 18–2 | Luis Alberto Lopez | TKO | 5 (12), 1:14 | 27 May 2023 | SSE Arena, Belfast, Northern Ireland | For IBF featherweight title |
| 19 | Win | 18–1 | Karim Guerfi | TKO | 1 (12), 2:34 | 10 Dec 2022 | SSE Arena, Belfast, Northern Ireland | |
| 18 | Win | 17–1 | Miguel Marriaga | UD | 10 | 6 Aug 2022 | SSE Arena, Belfast, Northern Ireland | |
| 17 | Loss | 16–1 | Leigh Wood | TKO | 12 (12), 1:25 | 12 Mar 2022 | Motorpoint Arena, Nottingham, England | For WBA (Regular) featherweight title |
| 16 | Win | 16–0 | TJ Doheny | UD | 12 | 6 Aug 2021 | Falls Park, Belfast, Northern Ireland | Won vacant WBA interim featherweight title |
| 15 | Win | 15–0 | Ionuț Băluță | MD | 12 | 30 Apr 2021 | York Hall, London, England | Won vacant WBO Inter-Continental super-bantamweight title |
| 14 | Win | 14–0 | Sofiane Takoucht | TKO | 10 (10), 1:54 | 15 Aug 2020 | York Hall, London, England | |
| 13 | Win | 13–0 | Vladimir Nikitin | UD | 10 | 14 Dec 2019 | Madison Square Garden, New York City, New York, US | Retained WBO Inter-Continental featherweight title |
| 12 | Win | 12–0 | Diego Alberto Ruiz | TKO | 9 (10), 1:34 | 3 Aug 2019 | Falls Park, Belfast, Northern Ireland | Retained WBO Inter-Continental featherweight title; Won vacant WBA Inter-Continental featherweight title |
| 11 | Win | 11–0 | Ruben Hernandez | UD | 10 | 17 Mar 2019 | The Theater at Madison Square Garden, New York City, New York, US | Retained WBO Inter-Continental featherweight title |
| 10 | Win | 10–0 | Jason Cunningham | UD | 10 | 22 Dec 2018 | Manchester Arena, Manchester, England | Won vacant WBO Inter-Continental featherweight title |
| 9 | Win | 9–0 | Nicola Cipolletta | TKO | 7 (8), 1:55 | 20 Oct 2018 | Park Theater, Paradise, Nevada, US | |
| 8 | Win | 8–0 | Adeilson Dos Santos | PTS | 8 | 30 Jun 2018 | SSE Arena, Belfast, Northern Ireland | |
| 7 | Win | 7–0 | Ibon Larrinaga | UD | 8 | 12 May 2018 | Madison Square Garden, New York City, New York, US | |
| 6 | Win | 6–0 | David Berna | TKO | 2 (8), 1:00 | 17 Mar 2018 | The Theater at Madison Square Garden, New York City, New York, US | |
| 5 | Win | 5–0 | Luis Fernando Molina | UD | 6 | 9 Dec 2017 | The Theater at Madison Square Garden, New York City, New York, US | |
| 4 | Win | 4–0 | Kenny Guzman | TKO | 2 (6), 2:59 | 22 Sep 2017 | Tucson Convention Center, Tucson, Arizona, US | |
| 3 | Win | 3–0 | Jarrett Owen | TKO | 3 (6), 1:56 | 2 Jul 2017 | Suncorp Stadium, Brisbane, Australia | |
| 2 | Win | 2–0 | Alfredo Chanez | TKO | 3 (6), 2:59 | 26 May 2017 | UIC Pavilion, Chicago, Illinois, US | |
| 1 | Win | 1–0 | Tim Ibarra | TKO | 3 (6), 0:59 | 17 Mar 2017 | The Theatre at Madison Square Garden, New York City, New York, US | |

== Television ==
In 2013, Conlan appeared in Celebrity Apprentice Ireland on TV3. In 2016, Conlan appeared in Road To Rio on RTÉ2.

== Awards ==
- European Amateur Championships:
  - Boxer of the Tournament: 2015
- RTÉ Sports Awards:
  - RTÉ Sports Person of the Year: 2015
