= 2017 Asian Amateur Boxing Championships =

Boxing competitions

2017 Asian Boxing Championships
- Host city: Tashkent, Uzbekistan
- Dates: 30 April – 7 May 2017
- Main venue: Uzbekistan Sport Complex

The 29th edition of the Men's Asian Amateur Boxing Championships was held from April 30 to May 7, 2017, in Tashkent, Uzbekistan.

== Medal summary ==
Event	Gold	Silver	Bronze
Light flyweight 49 kg	Hasanboy Dusmatov; Uzbekistan	Gankhuyagiin Gan-Erdene; Mongolia	Amit Panghal; India
Light flyweight 49 kg	Hasanboy Dusmatov; Uzbekistan	Gankhuyagiin Gan-Erdene; Mongolia	Rogen Ladon; Philippines
Flyweight; 52 kg	Jasurbek Latipov; Uzbekistan	Kim In-kyu; South Korea	Azamat Issakulov; Kazakhstan
Flyweight; 52 kg	Jasurbek Latipov; Uzbekistan	Kim In-kyu; South Korea	Daniel Maamo; Philippines
Bantamweight; 56 kg	Murodjon Akhmadaliev; Uzbekistan	Zhang Jiawei; China	Han Young-hun; South Korea
Bantamweight; 56 kg	Murodjon Akhmadaliev; Uzbekistan	Zhang Jiawei; China	Kairat Yeraliyev; Kazakhstan
Lightweight; 60 kg	Elnur Abduraimov; Uzbekistan	Shiva Thapa; India	Dorjnyambuugiin Otgondalai; Mongolia
Lightweight; 60 kg	Elnur Abduraimov; Uzbekistan	Shiva Thapa; India	Shan Jun; China
Light welterweight 64 kg	Ikboljon Kholdarov; Uzbekistan	Baatarsükhiin Chinzorig; Mongolia	Nurlan Kobashev; Kyrgyzstan
Light welterweight 64 kg	Ikboljon Kholdarov; Uzbekistan	Baatarsükhiin Chinzorig; Mongolia	Bekdaulet Ibragimov; Kazakhstan
Welterweight; 69 kg	Shakhram Giyasov; Uzbekistan	Ablaikhan Zhussupov; Kazakhstan	Sajjad Kazemzadeh; Iran
Welterweight; 69 kg	Shakhram Giyasov; Uzbekistan	Ablaikhan Zhussupov; Kazakhstan	Byambyn Tüvshinbat; Mongolia
Middleweight; 75 kg	Israil Madrimov; Uzbekistan	Lee Dong-yun; South Korea	Vikas Krishan Yadav; India
Middleweight; 75 kg	Israil Madrimov; Uzbekistan	Lee Dong-yun; South Korea	Abilkhan Amankul; Kazakhstan
Light heavyweight 81 kg	Bektemir Melikuziev; Uzbekistan	Yerik Alzhanov; Kazakhstan	Huang Jiabin; China
Light heavyweight 81 kg	Bektemir Melikuziev; Uzbekistan	Yerik Alzhanov; Kazakhstan	Nurýagdy Nurýagdyýew; Turkmenistan
Heavyweight; 91 kg	Vassiliy Levit; Kazakhstan	Sumit Sangwan; India	Alaaeddin Ghossoun; Syria
Heavyweight; 91 kg	Vassiliy Levit; Kazakhstan	Sumit Sangwan; India	Jahon Qurbonov; Tajikistan
Super heavyweight +91 kg	Bakhodir Jalolov; Uzbekistan	Kamshybek Kunkabayev; Kazakhstan	Mohammad Mlaiyes; Syria
Super heavyweight +91 kg	Bakhodir Jalolov; Uzbekistan	Kamshybek Kunkabayev; Kazakhstan	Hussein Ishaish; Jordan

== Medal table ==
Rank	Nation	Gold	Silver	Bronze	Total
1	Uzbekistan	9	0	0	9
2	Kazakhstan	1	3	4	8
3	India	0	2	2	4
3	Mongolia	0	2	2	4
5	South Korea	0	2	1	3
6	China	0	1	2	3
7	Philippines	0	0	2	2
7	Syria	0	0	2	2
9	Iran	0	0	1	1
9	Jordan	0	0	1	1
9	Kyrgyzstan	0	0	1	1
9	Tajikistan	0	0	1	1
9	Turkmenistan	0	0	1	1
Totals (13 entries)		10	10	20	40
