= Lionel Warawara =

Vanuatuan boxer (born 1995)

Personal information
- Born: January 26, 1995 (age 31)

Sport
- Country: Vanuatu
- Sport: Boxing
- Event: Men's bantamweight (56kg)
Medal record
Men's amateur boxing
Representing Vanuatu
Oceanian Championships
Silver medal – second place	2017 Gold Coast	Bantamweight
Pacific Games
Bronze medal – third place	2015 Port Moresby	Bantamweight
Pacific Mini Games
Gold medal – first place	2017 Port Vila	Bantamweight

Boe Lionel Warawara (born 26 January 1995) is a Vanuatuan bantamweight boxer who has represented his nation at international competitions.

== Boxing career ==
In 2014 and 2015 Warawara won the Vanuatu National Games in the 56 kg category.

He finished in third place at the 2015 Pacific Games after he lost to Henry Umings in the semifinal.

Warawara won the 2015 Oceania Boxing Confederation Championships (OCBC) in the bantamweight category against Jayden Hansen.

In 2016 he represented Vanuatu in the men's bantamweight at the 2016 Summer Olympics in Rio de Janeiro. He lost by unanimous decision in his first bout to Russia's Vladimir Nikitin.

He won the 2017 OCBC in the bantamweight category against Jones O'Kane by walkover.

In March 2017 Lionel Warawara began training at the https://www.warriorboxinggym.com in Brisbane, Australia under the tutelage of Aiba Star 2 coach Johnny Black. Qualification for the AIBA world championships 2017 were achieved, Later that year in December 2017 Lionel Warawara won a Gold medal at the pacific mini-game held in Vanuatu.

In April 2018 Lionel Warawara and his Head coach Johnny Black were selected to represent Vanuatu for the 2018 Commonwealth Games held on the Gold Coast.
