= Vladimir Nikitin (boxer) =

Russian boxer

Vladimir Nikitin Владимир Олегович Никитин
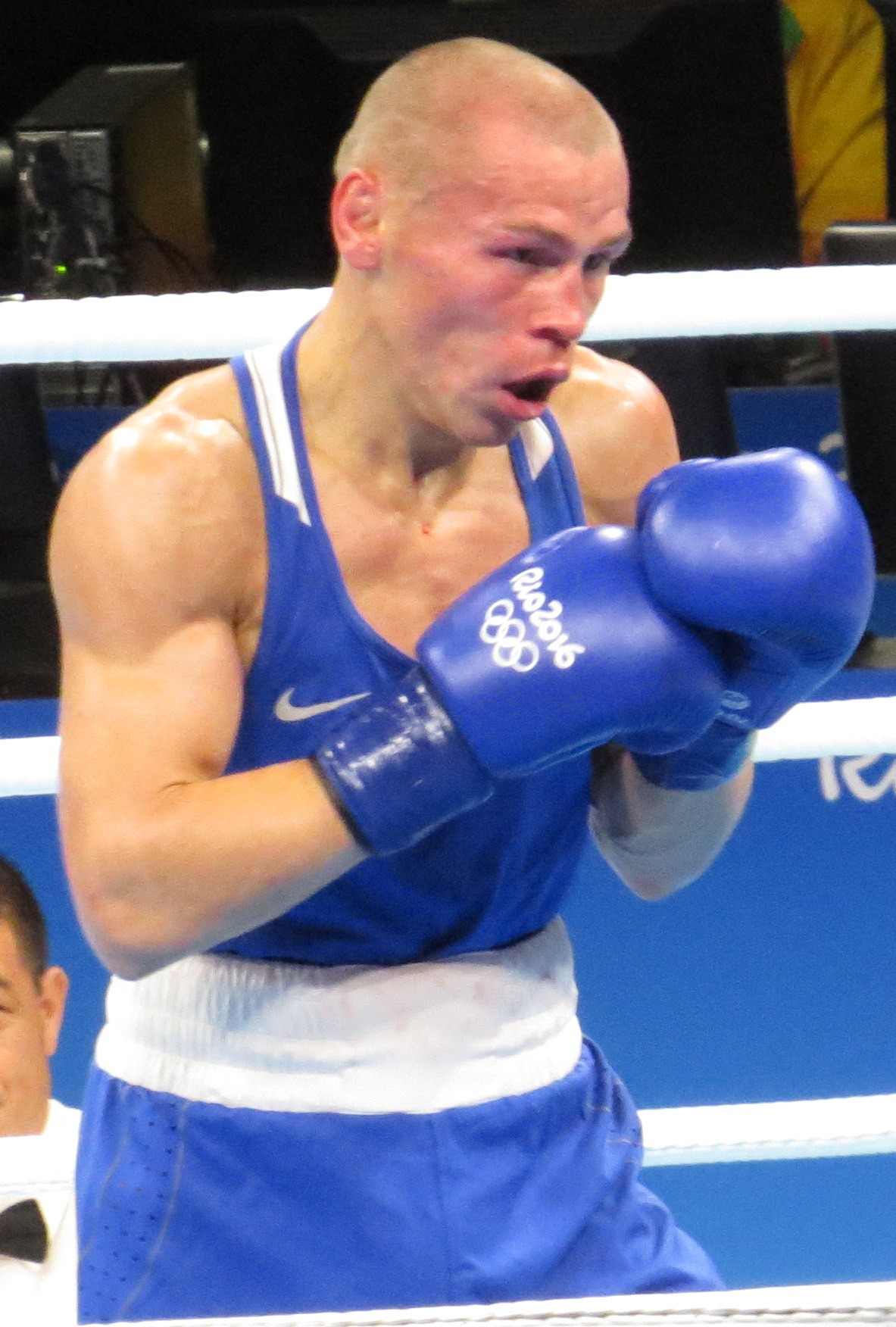
- Nikitin at the 2016 Summer Olympics

Personal information
- Nationality: Russian
- Born: 22 March 1990 (age 36) Verkhnyaya Maksakovka, Russian SFSR, Soviet Union
- Height: 5 ft 6 1/2 in (169 cm)
- Weight: Featherweight

Boxing career
- Reach: 68 in (173 cm)
- Stance: Orthodox

Boxing record
- Total fights: 9
- Wins: 7
- Win by KO: 2
- Losses: 1
- Draws: 1
Medal record
Men's Amateur boxing
Representing Russia
Olympic Games
Bronze medal – third place	2016 Rio	Bantamweight
World Amateur Championships
Silver medal – second place	2013 Almaty	Bantamweight
European Championships
Bronze medal – third place	2013 Minsk	Bantamweight

Vladimir Olegovich Nikitin (Russian: Владимир Олегович Никитин; born 22 March 1990) is a Russian professional boxer. He is best known for getting gifted the bronze medal at the 2016 Rio Olympics against Irish boxer Michael Conlan.

== Amateur career ==
Nikitin gained a bronze medal in the 2013 European Amateur Boxing Championships, losing to gold medallist John Joe Nevin in the semi-final. Later that year, he won silver at the 2013 AIBA World Boxing Championships, losing in the final to Azerbaijan's Javid Chalabiyev.

In the 2016 Olympics Nikitin secured another medal by reaching the semi-finals. His defeats of Chatchai Butdee and top seed Michael Conlan on judges decisions in the previous two rounds saw the Thai and Irish camps both question the integrity of the judges. Nikitin withdrew from the semi-final due to injuries sustained from the Conlan fight, but took home a bronze medal.

Vladimir Nikitin's final fight took place in Syktyvkar at a tournament dedicated to the 100th anniversary of the Komi Republic. The fight for the championship belt of the Eurasian Boxing Parliament with a representative of Tanzania Ally Mwerangi took place on August 19, 2022. Nikitin won.

== Professional boxing record ==
9 fights	7 wins	1 loss
By knockout	2	0
By decision	5	1
Draws	1	

No.	Result	Record	Opponent	Type	Round, time	Date	Location	Notes
9	Win	7–1–1	Ally Mwerangi	UD	10	19 Aug 2022	Luzales Arena, Syktyvkar, Russia	
8	Win	6–1–1	Tello Lithebe	RTD	3 (8), 3:00	26 Nov 2021	USC Soviet Wings, Moscow, Russia	
7	Win	5–1–1	Rauf Aghayev	RTD	3 (8), 3:00	22 Jul 2021	Dynamo Volleyball Arena, Moscow, Russia	
6	Draw	4–1–1	Yerzhan Zalilov	SD	8	23 Jan 2021	RCC Boxing Academy, Ekaterinburg, Russia	
5	Win	4–1	Oleksandr Yegorov	UD	8	5 Dec 2020	RCC Boxing Academy, Ekaterinburg, Russia	
4	Loss	3–1	Michael Conlan	UD	10	14 Dec 2019	Madison Square Garden, New York City, New York, US	For WBO Inter-Continental featherweight title
3	Win	3–0	Juan Tapia	MD	6	17 Mar 2019	The Theater at Madison Square Garden, New York City, New York, US	
2	Win	2–0	Clay Burns	UD	6	20 Oct 2018	Park Theater, Paradise, Nevada, US	
1	Win	1–0	Edward Kakembo	UD	6	28 Jul 2018	Kissimmee Civic Center, Kissimmee, Florida, US	
