= Kairat Yeraliyev =

Kazakhstani boxer (born 1990)

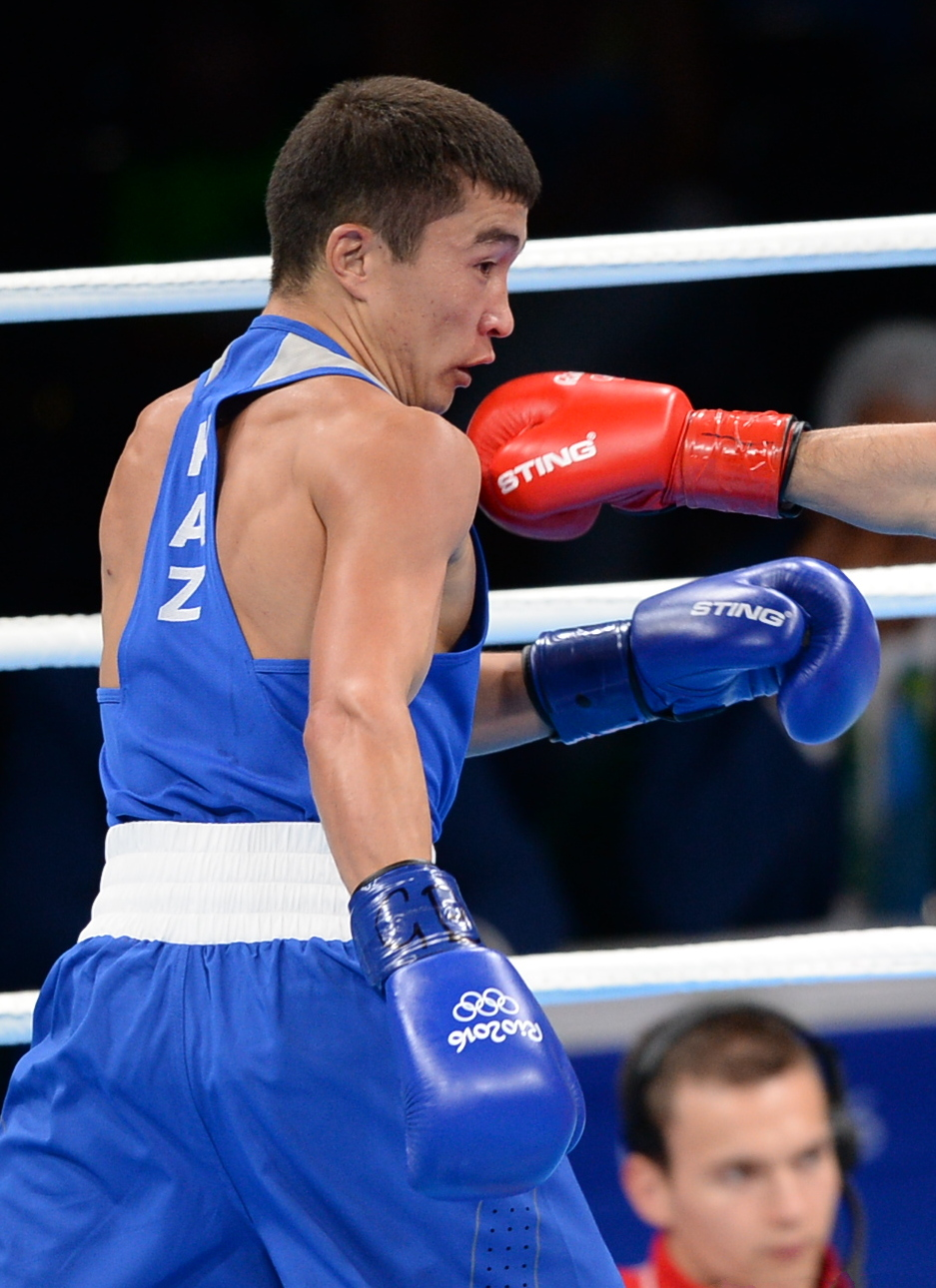
- Yeraliyev at the 2016 Olympics

Personal information
- Native name: Қайрат Ерәлиев
- Nationality: Kazakh
- Born: 8 November 1990 (age 35) Shymkent, Kazakh SSR, Soviet Union
- Height: 165 cm (5 ft 5 in)
- Weight: 56 kg (123 lb)

Sport
- Country: Kazakhstan
- Sport: Boxing
- Event: Bantamweight
- Coached by: Myrzagali Aitzhanov
Medal record
Representing Kazakhstan
World Amateur Championships
Gold medal – first place	2017 Hamburg	Bantamweight
Bronze medal – third place	2013 Almaty	Bantamweight
Asian Championships
Bronze medal – third place	2015 Bangkok	Bantamweight
Bronze medal – third place	2017 Tashkent	Bantamweight
Asian Games
Bronze medal – third place	2014 Incheon	Bantamweight
- Updated on 2 September 2017

Kairat Yeraliyev (Kazakh: Қайрат Ерәлиев, Qairat Eräliev; born 8 November 1990) is a Kazakh boxer who competes in the bantamweight division. He won bronze medals at the 2013 World Championships and 2014 Asian Games, but was eliminated in the second round of the 2016 Summer Olympics.

== Career ==
At the 2013 AIBA World Boxing Championships in Almaty, he beat Ravzan Andreiana, Omurbek Malabekov, and Olympic Champion Robeisy Ramírez. In the semifinals, he lost to Javid Chalabiyev of Azerbaijan.

At the 2014 Asian Games in Incheon, he beat Othman Arbabi and Mohammad Al-Wadi before losing in the semifinals to Ham Sang-myeong of South Korea.

He won the bronze medal at the men's bantamweight event at the 2015 Asian Amateur Boxing Championships.

In the 2016 Summer Olympics, he won his first bout against Javid Chalabiyev in the men's bantamweight class. In the second round he lost to Murodjon Akhmadaliev of Uzbekistan.

He won the bronze medal in the men's bantamweight event at the 2017 Asian Amateur Boxing Championships.

Kairat started the 2017 AIBA World Boxing Championships with a 5-0 win over Christopher Florez of Mexico in the first round, and a 4-1 victory over Murodjon Akhmadaliev of Uzbekistan in the second round. In quarterfinals Yeraliyev beat Omar El-Hag of Germany with a 5-0 score and in the semifinals he defeated Peter McGrail of England to advance to the finals. In the finals, Yeraliyev fought Duke Ragan of the United States, winning 3-2 and bringing home the gold medal.

In 2018 he won both the Presidents Cup and the Kazakh National Championship at bantamweight.

In 2021 he made his professional debut, winning a four round unanimous decision over Uzbekistan's Bakhit Abdurahimov at the Sapiyev Boxing Center in Karaganda.

== Professional boxing record ==
1 fight	1 win	0 losses
By decision	1	0

No.	Result	Record	Opponent	Type	Round, time	Date	Location	Notes
1	Win	1–0	Bakhit Abdurahimov	UD	4	22 Aug 2021	Boxing Centre Sapiyev, Karaganda, Kazakhstan	
