= 2013 AIBA World Boxing Championships =

Boxing competitions

- Venue: Baluan Sholak Palace of Culture and Sports
- Location: Almaty, Kazakhstan
- Start date: 14
- End date: 26 October 2013
- Competitors: 576 from 116 nations

The 2013 AIBA World Boxing Championships were held at the Baluan Sholak Palace of Culture and Sports in Almaty, Kazakhstan from 14 to 26 October 2013.

== Results ==
=== Medal table ===
Rank	Nation	Gold	Silver	Bronze	Total
1	Kazakhstan	4	2	2	8
2	Cuba	2	2	1	5
3	Azerbaijan	2	0	1	3
4	Russia	1	2	1	4
5	Italy	1	0	2	3
6	Brazil	0	1	1	2
6	Ireland	0	1	1	2
6	Uzbekistan	0	1	1	2
9	Algeria	0	1	0	1
10	Germany	0	0	2	2
11	Argentina	0	0	1	1
11	Costa Rica	0	0	1	1
11	England	0	0	1	1
11	Mongolia	0	0	1	1
11	Thailand	0	0	1	1
11	Ukraine	0	0	1	1
11	Venezuela	0	0	1	1
11	Wales	0	0	1	1
Totals (18 entries)		10	10	20	40

=== Medal summary ===
Event	Gold	Silver	Bronze
Light flyweight	Birzhan Zhakypov; Kazakhstan	Mohamed Flissi; Algeria	Yosvany Veitía; Cuba
Light flyweight	Birzhan Zhakypov; Kazakhstan	Mohamed Flissi; Algeria	David Jiménez; Costa Rica
Flyweight	Misha Aloyan; Russia	Jasurbek Latipov; Uzbekistan	Andrew Selby; Wales
Flyweight	Misha Aloyan; Russia	Jasurbek Latipov; Uzbekistan	Chatchai Butdee; Thailand
Bantamweight	Javid Chalabiyev; Azerbaijan	Vladimir Nikitin; Russia	Kairat Yeraliyev; Kazakhstan
Bantamweight	Javid Chalabiyev; Azerbaijan	Vladimir Nikitin; Russia	Mykola Butsenko; Ukraine
Lightweight	Lázaro Álvarez; Cuba	Robson Conceição; Brazil	Domenico Valentino; Italy
Lightweight	Lázaro Álvarez; Cuba	Robson Conceição; Brazil	Berik Abdrakhmanov; Kazakhstan
Light welterweight	Merey Akshalov; Kazakhstan	Yasniel Toledo; Cuba	Éverton Lopes; Brazil
Light welterweight	Merey Akshalov; Kazakhstan	Yasniel Toledo; Cuba	Uranchimegiin Mönkh-Erdene; Mongolia
Welterweight	Daniyar Yeleussinov; Kazakhstan	Arisnoidys Despaigne; Cuba	Arajik Marutjan; Germany
Welterweight	Daniyar Yeleussinov; Kazakhstan	Arisnoidys Despaigne; Cuba	Gabriel Maestre; Venezuela
Middleweight	Zhanibek Alimkhanuly; Kazakhstan	Jason Quigley; Ireland	Anthony Fowler; England
Middleweight	Zhanibek Alimkhanuly; Kazakhstan	Jason Quigley; Ireland	Artem Chebotarev; Russia
Light heavyweight	Julio César La Cruz; Cuba	Adilbek Niyazymbetov; Kazakhstan	Oybek Mamazulunov; Uzbekistan
Light heavyweight	Julio César La Cruz; Cuba	Adilbek Niyazymbetov; Kazakhstan	Joe Ward; Ireland
Heavyweight	Clemente Russo; Italy	Evgeny Tishchenko; Russia	Teymur Mammadov; Azerbaijan
Heavyweight	Clemente Russo; Italy	Evgeny Tishchenko; Russia	Yamil Peralta; Argentina
Super heavyweight	Magomedrasul Majidov; Azerbaijan	Ivan Dychko; Kazakhstan	Roberto Cammarelle; Italy
Super heavyweight	Magomedrasul Majidov; Azerbaijan	Ivan Dychko; Kazakhstan	Erik Pfeifer; Germany
