= Hakan Erşeker =

Qatari boxer (born 1994)

Personal information
- Born: 5 July 1994 (age 32)

Sport
- Country: Qatar
- Sport: Boxing

Hakan Erşeker (born 5 July 1994) is a Qatari boxer. He competed in the men's lightweight event at the 2016 Summer Olympics.
