= Murodjon Akhmadaliev =

Uzbek boxer (born 1994)

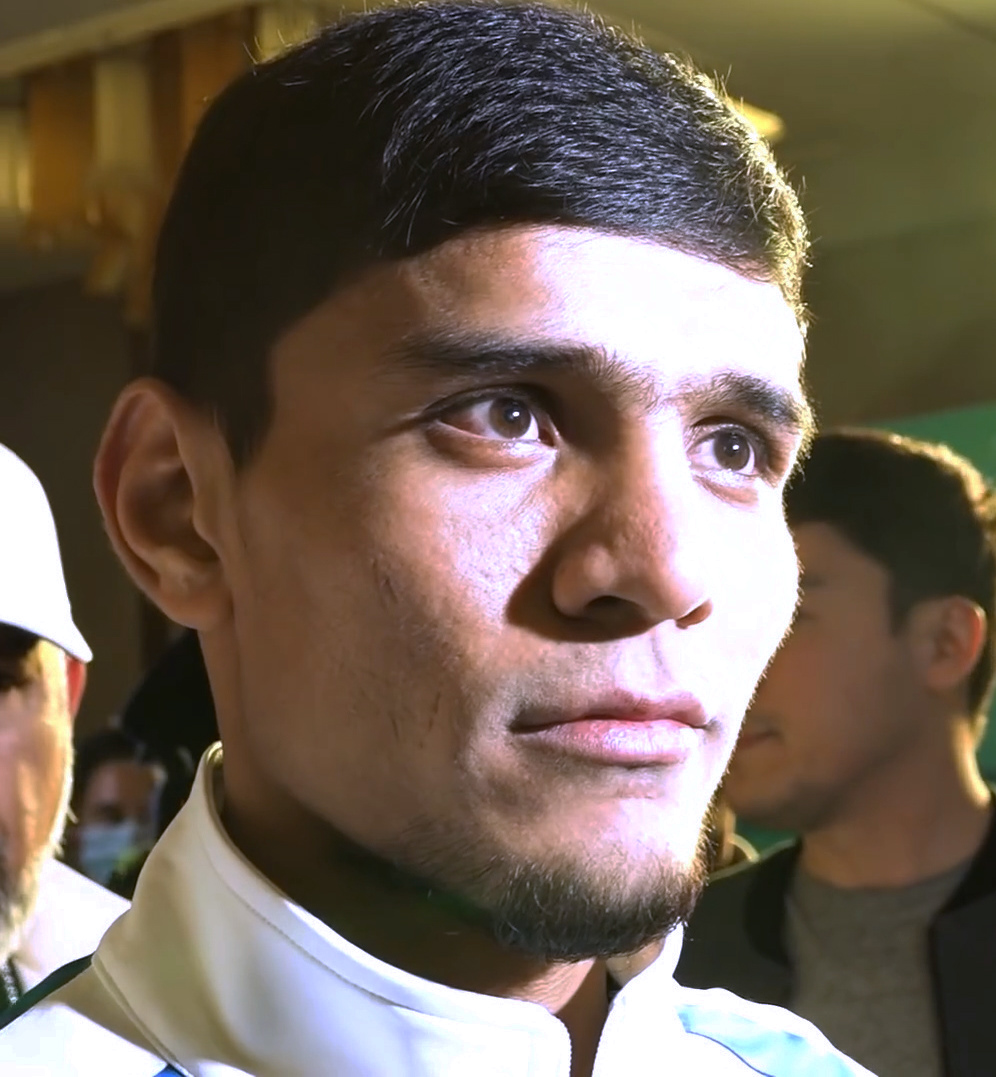
- Akhmadaliev in 2021

Personal information
- Nickname: MJ
- Born: Murodzhon Kakharovich Akhmadaliyev; 2 November 1994 (age 31) Chust, Uzbekistan
- Height: 5 ft 5 1/2 in (166 cm)
- Weight: Super bantamweight; Featherweight; Super featherweight

Boxing career
- Reach: 68 in (173 cm)
- Stance: Southpaw

Boxing record
- Total fights: 17
- Wins: 15
- Win by KO: 12
- Losses: 2
- Draws: 0
Medal record
Men's Amateur boxing
Representing Uzbekistan
Olympic Games
| Bronze medal – third place | 2016 Rio | Bantamweight |
World Amateur Championships
| Silver medal – second place | 2015 Doha | Bantamweight |
Asian Amateur Championships
| Silver medal – second place | 2015 Bangkok | Bantamweight |
| Gold medal – first place | 2017 Tashkent | Bantamweight |

Murodjon Kakharovich Akhmadaliev (Uzbek: Murodjon Qahor oʻgʻli Axmadaliyev; born 2 November 1994), also known as MJ, is an Uzbekistani professional boxer. He is a former unified super-bantamweight champion, having held the WBA (Super), and IBF titles between 2020 and 2023. He trained under Tulkin Kilichev, the head coach of Uzbekistan’s national boxing team.

As an amateur, he won a silver medal at the 2015 World Championships and a bronze at the 2016 Olympics as a bantamweight.

== Amateur career ==
=== Olympic result ===
Rio 2016

- Round of 16: Defeated Kairat Yeraliyev (Kazakhstan) 3–0
- Quarter-finals: Defeated Alberto Melián (Argentina) TKO
- Semi-finals: Defeated by Robeisy Ramírez (Cuba) 3–0

== Professional career ==
=== Early career ===
On 10 March 2018, Akhmadaliev made his professional debut against David Michel Paz of Argentina. Akhmadaliev won the bout via knockout in the opening round after his opponent was unable to recover from a body shot. Akhmadaliev fought for a second time professionally on 21 April 2018 against Carlos Gaston Suarez. Akhmadaliev won via technical knockout after hitting his opponent with several unanswered shots in the fourth round.

On 14 July 2018, Akhmadaliev defeated the durable Luis Fernando Molina on route to a unanimous points decision win. Akhmadaliev’s fourth professional fight was against Ramon Contreras on 23 August 2018. In the opening round, Akhmadaliev put his opponent on the canvas after he landed a heavy left hand to the body. Referee Thomas Taylor proceeded to end the bout after Contreras was unable to beat the ten count. Akhmadaliev fought against Issac Zarate on 24 November 2018. Akhmadaliev hurt Zarate a number of times throughout the bout after landing a series of heavy punches and in the ninth round, Akhmadaliev landed several hard blows to the head of Zarate which forced referee Eric Dali to end the bout.

On 25 April 2019, it was announced that Akhmadaliev had signed a contract with Matchroom Sport where he would be promoted by Eddie Hearn. On 26 April 2019 Akhmadaliev fought against Carlos Carlson, in the third round Akhmadaliev put his opponent on the canvas after landing a heavy right hand to the head of Carlson. Referee Jerry Cantu immediately stopped the bout. On 13 September 2019, Akhmadaliev beat Wilner Soto by technical knockout after landing several unanswered punches.

=== Unified Super Bantamweight champion ===
==== Akhmadaliev vs. Roman ====
On 11 December 2019, it was announced that Akhmadaliev would face unified WBA and IBF super-bantamweight champion Daniel Roman. The bout was initially due to take place on 13 September 2019 in New York City, however the fight was postponed after Roman suffered a shoulder injury during training camp. The fight was rescheduled to take place on 30 January 2020 at the Meridian at Island Gardens in Miami, Florida. Akhmadaliev defeated Roman via controversial split decision to become Uzbekistan's first ever unified world champion. Two judges scored the bout 115–113 to Akhmadaliev while the third scored it 115–113 to Roman.

==== Akhmadaliev vs. Iwasa ====
It was revealed on 11 January 2021, by various Uzbek media outlets that Akhmadaliev was looking to defend his unified crown against the interim IBF champion Ryosuke Iwasa. DAZN later announced the bout for 3 April 2021, in Tashkent, Uzbekistan. Akhmadaliev was a -700 favorite heading into the bout, with most fight analysts predicting an Akhmadaliev stoppage victory. Iwasa came into fight after inactivity of 2 years and 7 months. Akhmadaliev beat the veteran contender by a fifth-round knockout. He outstruck Iwasa by 109-36 in overall punches, landing nearly as many total punches and power shots in the fifth round alone as Iwasa landed in the entire fight. During the post-fight interview, Akhmadaliev stated his desire to fully unify at super bantamweight.

==== Akhmadaliev vs. Velasquez ====
It was announced on 4 October 2021, that Akhmadaliev would make his third WBA and IBF title defense against the WBC-NABF super bantamweight titlist Ronny Rios. The bout was scheduled for the undercard of the Demetrius Andrade and Jason Quigley middleweight title fight, which will be held on 19 November 2021 at the SNHU Arena in Manchester, New Hampshire. Rios was later forced to withdraw from the bout due to a positive COVID-19 test. Akhmadaliev was rescheduled to face the #11 ranked WBO bantamweight Jose Velasquez at the same event. He entered the bout as a -600 favorite, with most odds-makers expecting a victory from the champion. Akhmadaliev won the fight by unanimous decision, losing only the seventh round, with all three judges awarding him a 119-109 scorecard. Akhmadaliev furthermore stated that he would like to honor his commitment against Ronny Rios.

==== Akhmadaliev vs. Rios ====
On 4 January 2022, Akhmadaliev was ordered by the IBF to make his fourth title defense against mandatory title challenger Marlon Tapales. Although the two camps were given until 2 February to iron out the terms of the bout, Tapales' representatives instead opted to forego the assigned negotiation period and head straight to a purse bid, which was scheduled by the IBF for 18 January. The purse bid was postponed by a week on 18 January, giving both parties seven days to come to terms.

On 24 January 2022, Akhmaladiev was furthermore ordered by the WBA to make a mandatory title defense against Ronny Rios by 24 May 2021. The IBF and WBA came to agreement on 28 January, which would see Akhmaladiev first make his mandatory WBA title defense against Rios and then his mandatory IBF title defense against Tapales. The title defense against Rios was officially announced for 11 June, as the main event of a DAZN broadcast card taking place in San Antonio, Texas. Akhmaladiev won the fight by a twelfth-round technical knockout. He first knocked Rios down with a flurry of punches midway through the last round, and although Rios was able to beat the count, he was stopped with another flurry of punches soon afterward.

==== Akhmadaliev vs. Tapales ====
On 18 September 2022, the IBF ordered Akhmadaliev to face their mandatory super bantamweight title challenger Marlon Tapales. Tapales' team requested the bout to head to an immediate purse bid, after the fight was re-ordered on 4 December. Although a purse bid was scheduled to take place on 20 December, the IBF delayed it by two weeks at the request of both camps. The pair came to an agreement on 3 January 2023. The championship bout was booked to take place on 8 April 2023, at the Tech Port Arena in San Antonio, Texas. Akhmadaliev lost the fight by split decision. Two of the judges scored the bout 115–113 for Tapales, while the third judge awarded Akhmadaliev a wider 118–110 scorecard.

=== Post reign ===
==== Akhmaladiev vs. Gonzalez ====
Although Akhmaladiev's co-promoters Matchroom Boxing and World Of Boxing petitioned the sanctioning body to order an immediate rematch with Marlon Tapales, the WBA instead ordered Akhmaladiev to face the former WBO bantamweight champion in a super bantamweight title eliminator. That same day, on 5 June 2023, the WBA ordered Akhmaladiev to face their second-ranked super bantamweight contender Tomoki Kameda in a super bantamweight title eliminator. Kameda formally declined the fight on 28 June, informing the sanctioning body of his intentions to campaign at featherweight in the future. Consequently, the Uzbek was ordered to enter into negotiations with the third-ranked contender Kevin Gonzalez. As they failed to come to terms, a purse bid was scheduled to take place on 9 October 2023. The promotional rights were won by Matchroom Boxing, who submitted a bid of $120,000. The fight is scheduled to take place on 16 December 2023. Akhmaladiev won the fight by 8th round TKO.

Akhmadaliev was scheduled to face Ricardo Espinoza Franco for interim WBA super bantamweight title in Monte Carlo, Monaco on 14 December 2024. Akhmadaliev won the fight by TKO in the 3rd round.

== Professional boxing record ==
| 17 fights | 15 wins | 2 losses |
|---|---|---|
| By knockout | 12 | 0 |
| By decision | 3 | 2 |

| No. | Result | Record | Opponent | Type | Round, time | Date | Location | Notes |
|---|---|---|---|---|---|---|---|---|
| 17 | Win | 15–2 | Hegly Mosqueda | TKO | 4 (10), 2:13 | 29 May 2026 | Humo Arena, Tashkent, Uzbekistan | |
| 16 | Loss | 14–2 | Naoya Inoue | UD | 12 | 14 Sep 2025 | IG Arena, Nagoya, Japan | For WBA (Super), WBC, IBF, WBO and The Ring super bantamweight titles |
| 15 | Win | 14–1 | Luis Castillo | TKO | 8 (10), 2:05 | 30 May 2025 | Domo Alcalde, Guadalajara, Mexico | |
| 14 | Win | 13–1 | Ricardo Espinoza Franco | TKO | 3 (12), 2:59 | 14 Dec 2024 | Salle des Étoiles, Monte Carlo, Monaco | Won interim WBA super-bantamweight title |
| 13 | Win | 12–1 | Kevin Gonzalez | TKO | 8 (12), 2:49 | 16 Dec 2023 | Desert Diamond Arena, Glendale, Arizona, US | |
| 12 | Loss | 11–1 | Marlon Tapales | SD | 12 | 8 Apr 2023 | Boeing Center at Tech Port, San Antonio, Texas, US | Lost WBA (Super) and IBF super-bantamweight titles |
| 11 | Win | 11–0 | Ronny Rios | TKO | 12 (12), 2:06 | 25 Jun 2022 | Tech Port Arena, San Antonio, Texas, US | Retained WBA (Super) and IBF super-bantamweight titles |
| 10 | Win | 10–0 | Jose Velasquez | UD | 12 | 19 Nov 2021 | SNHU Arena, Manchester, New Hampshire, US | Retained WBA (Super) and IBF super-bantamweight titles |
| 9 | Win | 9–0 | Ryosuke Iwasa | TKO | 5 (12), 1:30 | 3 Apr 2021 | Humo Arena, Tashkent, Uzbekistan | Retained WBA (Super) and IBF super-bantamweight titles |
| 8 | Win | 8–0 | Daniel Roman | SD | 12 | 30 Jan 2020 | Meridian at Island Gardens, Miami, Florida, US | Won WBA (Super) and IBF super-bantamweight titles |
| 7 | Win | 7–0 | Wilner Soto | TKO | 4 (8), 1:56 | 13 Sep 2019 | The Theater at Madison Square Garden, New York City, New York, US | |
| 6 | Win | 6–0 | Carlos Carlson | KO | 3 (8), 2:51 | 26 Apr 2019 | The Forum, Inglewood, California, US | |
| 5 | Win | 5–0 | Isaac Zarate | TKO | 9 (10), 1:17 | 24 Nov 2018 | Hard Rock Live, Atlantic City, New Jersey, US | Retained WBA Inter-Continental super-bantamweight title |
| 4 | Win | 4–0 | Ramon Contreras | KO | 1 (10), 1:20 | 23 Aug 2018 | The Hangar, Costa Mesa, California, US | Won vacant WBA Inter-Continental super-bantamweight title |
| 3 | Win | 3–0 | Luis Fernando Molina | UD | 6 | 14 Jul 2018 | Florentine Gardens, Los Angeles, California, US | |
| 2 | Win | 2–0 | Carlos Gaston Suarez | TKO | 4 (6), 1:09 | 21 Apr 2018 | Kings Theatre, New York City, New York, US | |
| 1 | Win | 1–0 | David Michel Paz | TKO | 1 (6), 1:08 | 10 Mar 2018 | Kings Theatre, New York City, New York, US | |

== See also ==
- List of male boxers
- List of southpaw stance boxers
- List of world super-bantamweight boxing champions

Sporting positions
Regional boxing titles
| Vacant Title last held by Evgeny Gradovich | WBA Inter-Continental super-bantamweight champion 23 August 2018 – March 2019 | Vacant Title next held by Jack Bateson |
World boxing titles
| Preceded by Daniel Roman | WBA super-bantamweight champion Super title 30 January 2020 – 8 April 2023 | Succeeded by Marlon Tapales |
| Preceded by Daniel Roman | IBF super-bantamweight champion 30 January 2020 – 8 April 2023 | Succeeded by Marlon Tapales |
| Vacant Title last held by Brandon Figueroa | WBA super-bantamweight champion Interim title 14 December 2024 – present | Incumbent |
