= Javid Chalabiyev =

Azerbaijani boxer (born 1992)

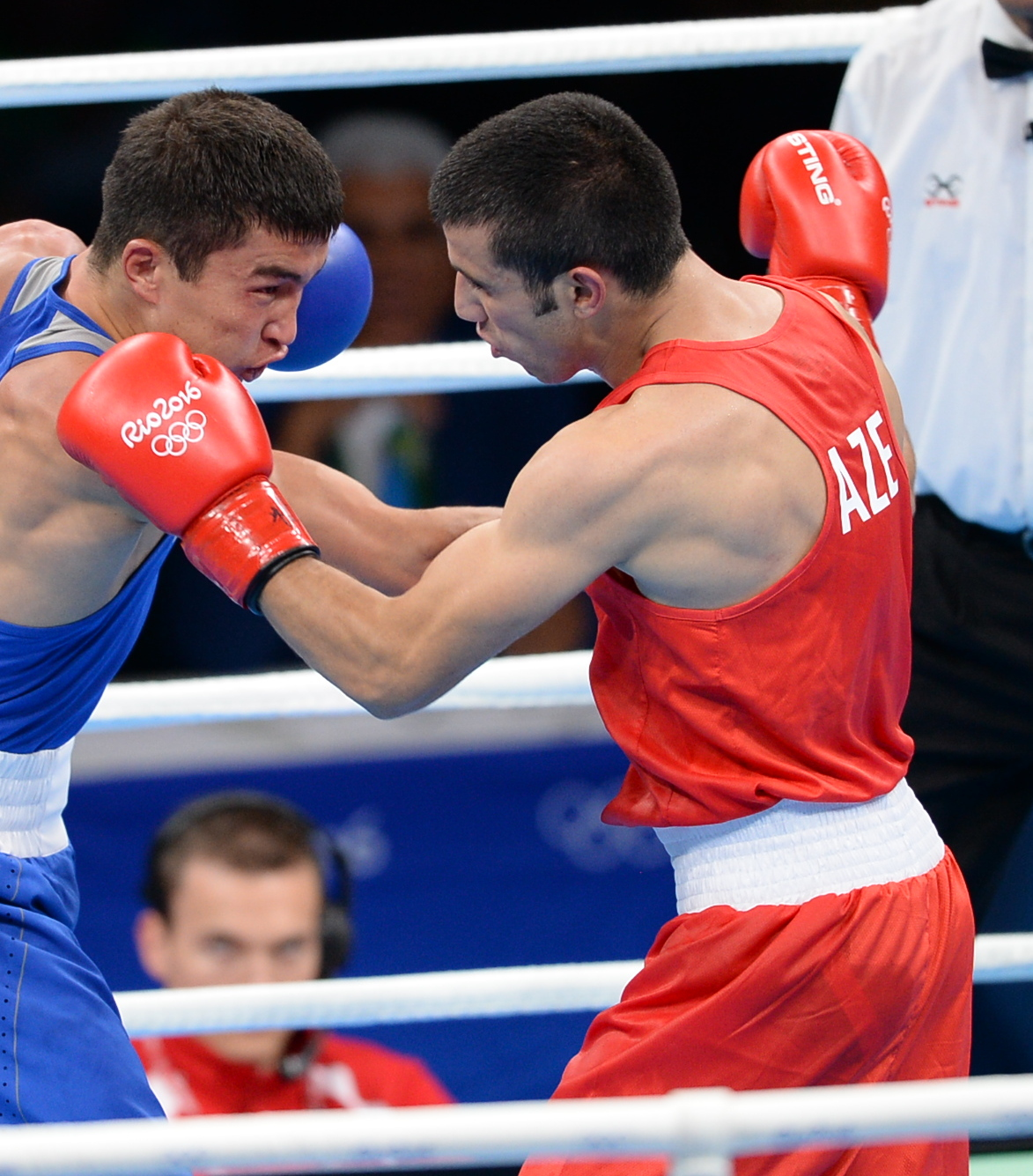
- Chalabiyev at the 2016 Olympics

Personal information
- Born: 17 May 1992 (age 34)
- Height: 170 cm (5 ft 7 in)

Sport
- Sport: Boxing
- Event: Bantamweight
- Coached by: Pedro Roque
Medal record
Representing Azerbaijan
World Amateur Championships
Gold medal – first place	2013 Almaty	-56 kg
Islamic Solidarity Games
Gold medal – first place	2017 Baku	-60 kg

Javid Chalabiyev (Azerbaijani: Cavid Çələbiyev, born 17 May 1992) is an amateur boxer from Azerbaijan who competes in the −56 kg bantamweight division. He won the 2013 World Boxing Championship title and competed at the 2016 Summer Olympics, where he was eliminated in the first bout. He competed at the 2020 Summer Olympics where he was eliminated in the round of 16.

== Career highlights ==
2013 World Championships
Event	Round	Result	Opponent	Score
Middleweight	First	Win	(Tajikistan) Oraz Avzalshoev	2-1
Middleweight	Second	Win	(Mongolia) Tugstsogt Nyambayar	2-1
Middleweight	Third	Win	(Kenya) Benson Gicharu	2-1
Middleweight	Quarterfinal	Win	(India) Shiva Thapa	3-0
Middleweight	Semifinal	Win	(Kazakhstan) Kairat Yeraliyev	2-1
Middleweight	Final	Win	(Russia) Vladimir Nikitin	3-0
