= Bantamweight =

Weight class in combat sports

Bantamweight is a weight class in combat sports and weightlifting. For boxing, the range is above 115 lb (52.2 kg) and up to 118 lb (53.5 kg). In kickboxing, a bantamweight fighter generally weighs between 53 and 55 kilograms (117 and 121 lb). In MMA, bantamweight is 126–135 lb (57.2–61.2 kg).

The name for the class is derived from bantam chickens. Brazilian jiu-jitsu has an equivalent Rooster weight.

== Boxing ==
The first gloved world title fight in this division was fought between George Dixon and Nunc Wallace on June 27, 1890, with Dixon winning and thus becoming the inaugural world bantamweight champion. At the time, the limit for this weight class was 110 pounds. In 1910, however, the British settled on a limit of 118.

From 2018 to 2019, an eight-man tournament called the World Boxing Super Series was held to determine the best bantamweight in the world. The tournament was won by Naoya Inoue, who defeated Nonito Donaire in the final.

On December 13, 2022, Naoya Inoue became the first undisputed champion of the division in the four-belt era.

=== Current world champions ===
Sanctioning body	Reign began	Champion	Record	Defenses
WBA	Jun 12, 2026	Jesse Rodriguez	24–0 (17 KO)	0
WBC	November 24, 2025	Takuma Inoue	22–2 (5 KO)	1
IBF	December 13, 2025	José Salas	17–0 (11 KO)	0
WBO	September 14, 2025	Christian Medina	27–4 (19 KO)	1

=== Current The Ring world rankings ===
As of September 24, 2025.

Keys:

C Current The Ring world champion

Rank	Name	Record	Title(s)
C	vacant		
1	Seiya Tsutsumi	12–0–3 (8 KO)	
2	Christian Medina	26–4 (19 KO)	WBO
3	Ryosuke Nishida	10–1 (2 KO)	
4	Takuma Inoue	20–2 (5 KO)	
5	Daigo Higa	21–3–3 (19 KO)	
6	Antonio Vargas	19–1–1–1 (11 KO)	WBA
7	Yoshiki Takei	11–1 (9 KO)	
8	Tenshin Nasukawa	7–0 (2 KO)	
9	Jason Moloney	27–4 (19 KO)	
10	Jeyvier Cintrón	13–1–0–1 (6 KO)	

=== Longest reigning world bantamweight champions ===
Below is a list of longest reigning bantamweight champions in boxing measured by the individual's longest reign. Career total time as champion (for multiple time champions) does not apply.

	Name	Title reign	Title recognition	Successful defenses	Beaten opponents	Fights
1.	Anselmo Moreno	6 years, 3 months, 26 days	WBA	12	11	
2.	Veeraphol Sahaprom	6 years, 3 months, 17 days	WBC	14	11	
3.	Orlando Canizales	6 years, 3 months, 16 days	IBF	16	15	
4.	Shinsuke Yamanaka	5 years, 9 months, 9 days	WBC	12	11	
5.	Tim Austin	5 years, 6 months, 26 days	IBF	9	9	
6.	Hozumi Hasegawa	5 years, 14 days	WBC	10	10	
7.	Panama Al Brown	4 years, 9 months, 28 days	NYSAC, NBA, IBU	10	8	
8.	Naoya Inoue	4 years, 7 months, 13 days	WBA, WBC, IBF, WBO	8	7	
9.	Eder Jofre	4 years, 6 months	NBA, WBA, WBC	8	8	
10.	Manuel Ortiz	4 years, 4 months, 29 days	World	15	11	

Active Title Reign
Reign has ended

=== Lineal Champions ===
- (Canada) George Dixon (1890) Vacated
- (United States) Jimmy Barry (1897–1899) Retired
- (United States) Terry McGovern (1899) Vacated
- (United States) Harry Harris (1901) Vacated
- (United States) Harry Forbes (1901–1903)
- (United States) Frankie Neil (1903–1904)
- (United Kingdom) Joe Bowker (1904–1905) Vacated
- (United States) Jimmy Walsh (1905–1909)
- (United States) Jimmy Reagan (1909)
- (United States) Monte Attell (1909–1910)
- (United States) Frankie Conley (1910–1911)
- (United States) Johnny Coulon (1911–1914)
- (United States) Kid Williams (1914–1917)
- (United States) Pete Herman (1917–20)
- (United States) Joe Lynch (1920-21)
- (United States) Pete Herman (1921) (2)
- (United States) Johnny Buff (1921-1922)
- (United States) Joe Lynch (1922-1924)
- (United States) Abe Goldstein (1924)
- (United States) Eddie Martin (1924-1925)
- (United States) Charley Phil Rosenberg (1925-1927) Vacated
- (Panama) Al Brown (1931-1935)
- (Spain) Baltasar Sangchili (1935-1936)
- (United States) Tony Marino (1936)
- (Puerto Rico) Sixto Escobar (1936-1937)
- (United States) Harry Jeffra (1937-1938)
- (Puerto Rico) Sixto Escobar (1938-1939) (2) Vacated
- (United States) Lou Salica (1940-1942)
- (United States) Manuel Ortiz (1942-1947)
- (United States) Harold Dade (1947)
- (United States) Manuel Ortiz (1947-1950)
- Vic Toweel (1950-1952) South Africa
- (Australia) Jimmy Carruthers (1952-1954) Retired
- (France) Robert Cohen (1954-1956)
- (Italy) Mario D'agata (1956-1957)
- (France) Alphonse Halimi (1957-1959)
- (Mexico) Jose Becerra (1959-1960) Retired
- (Brazil) Eder Jofre (1961-1965)
- (Japan) Masahiko Harada (1965-1968)
- (Australia) Lionel Rose (1968-1969)
- (Mexico) Ruben Olivares (1969-1970)
- (Mexico) Jesus Castillo (1970-1971)
- (Mexico) Ruben Olivares (1971-1972) (2)
- (Mexico) Rafael Herrera (1972)
- (Panama) Enrique Pinder (1972-1973)
- (Mexico) Romeo Anaya (1973)
- (South Africa) Arnold Taylor (1973-1974)
- (South Korea) Soo-Hwan Hong (1974-1975)
- (Mexico) Alfonso Zamora (1975-1977)
- (Panama) Jorge Luján (1977-1980)
- (Puerto Rico) Julian Solis (1980)
- (United States) Jeff Chandler (1980-1984)
- (United States) Richard Sandoval (1984-1986)
- (United States) Jose Canizales (1986)
- (Venezuela) Bernardo Piñango (1986-1987) Vacated
- (Japan) Naoya Inoue (2022-2023) Vacated

==== Olympic Champions ====
- 1904: Oliver Kirk (USA)
- 1908: Henry Thomas (GBR)
- 1920: Clarence Walker (RSA)
- 1924: William Smith (RSA)
- 1928: Vittorio Tamagnini (ITA)
- 1932: Horace Gwynne (CAN)
- 1936: Ulderico Sergo (ITA)
- 1948: Tibor Csík (HUN)
- 1952: Pentti Hämäläinen (FIN)
- 1956: Wolfgang Behrendt (EUA)
- 1960: Oleg Grigoryev (URS)
- 1964: Takao Sakurai (JPN)
- 1968: Valerian Sokolov (URS)
- 1972: Orlando Martínez (CUB)
- 1976: Gu Yong-Ju (PRK)
- 1980: Juan Hernández (CUB)
- 1984: Maurizio Stecca (ITA)
- 1988: Kennedy McKinney (USA)
- 1992: Joel Casamayor (CUB)
- 1996: István Kovács (HUN)
- 2000: Guillermo Rigondeaux (CUB)
- 2004: Guillermo Rigondeaux (CUB)
- 2008: Enkhbatyn Badar-Uugan (MGL)
- 2012: Luke Campbell (GBR)
- 2016: Robeisy Ramírez (CUB)

==== World Champions ====
- 1974: (Puerto Rico) Wilfredo Gómez (PUR)
- 1978: (Cuba) Adolfo Horta (CUB)
- 1982: (United States) Floyd Favors (USA)
- 1986: (South Korea) Sung-Kil Moon (KOR)
- 1989: (Cuba) Enrique Carrión (CUB)
- 1991: (Bulgaria) Serafim Todorov (BUL)
- 1993: (Bulgaria) Aleksandar Khristov (BUL)
- 1995: (Russia) Raimkul Malakhbekov (RUS)
- 1997: (Russia) Raimkul Malakhbekov (RUS)
- 1999: (Romania) George Olteanu (ROU)
- 2001: (Cuba) Guillermo Rigondeaux (CUB)
- 2003: (Azerbaijan) Aghasi Mammadov (AZE)
- 2005: (Cuba) Guillermo Rigondeaux (CUB)
- 2007: (Russia) Sergey Vodopyanov (RUS)
- 2009: (Bulgaria) Detelin Dalakliev (BUL)
- 2011: (Cuba) Lázaro Álvarez (CUB)
- 2013: (Azerbaijan) Javid Chalabiyev (AZE)
- 2015: (Republic of Ireland) Michael Conlan (IRL)
- 2017: (Kazakhstan) Kairat Yeraliyev (KAZ)
- 2021: (Japan) Tomoya Tsuboi (JPN)

==== Pan American Champions ====
- 1951: (Argentina) Ricardo Gonzales (ARG)
- 1955: (Venezuela) Salvador Enriquez (VEN)
- 1959: (Brazil) Waldo Claudiano (BRA)
- 1963: (Argentina) Abel Almaraz (ARG)
- 1967: (Mexico) Juvencio Martínez (MEX)
- 1971: (Mexico) Pedro Flores (MEX)
- 1975: (Cuba) Orlando Martínez (CUB)
- 1979: (United States) Jackie Beard (USA)
- 1983: (Venezuela) Manuel Vilchez (VEN)
- 1987: (Cuba) Manuel Martínez (CUB)
- 1991: (Cuba) Enrique Carrion (CUB)
- 1995: (Cuba) Juan Despaigne (CUB)
- 1999: (United States) Gerald Tucker (USA)
- 2003: (Cuba) Daniel Chyutin (CUB)
- 2007: (Mexico) Carlos Cuadras (MEX)
- 2011: (Cuba) Lázaro Álvarez (CUB)

==== European Champions ====
- 1924: (France) Jean Ces
- 1925: (England) Archie Rule
- 1927: (Germany) Kurt Dalchow
- 1928: (Italy) Vittorio Tamagnini
- 1930: (Hungary) János Széles
- 1932: (Germany) Hans Ziglarski
- 1934: (Hungary) István Enekes
- 1937: (Italy) Ulderico Sergo
- 1939: (Italy) Ulderico Sergo
- ~~1942: (Italy)~~ Arturo Paoletti
- 1947: (Hungary) László Bogacs
- 1949: (Italy) Giovanni Zuddas
- 1951: (Italy) Vincenzo dall'Osso
- 1953: (Poland) Zenon Stefaniuk
- 1955: (Poland) Zenon Stefaniuk
- 1957: (Soviet Union) Oleg Grigoryev
- 1959: (West Germany) Horst Rascher
- 1961: (Soviet Union) Sergey Sivko
- 1963: (Soviet Union) Oleg Grigoryev
- 1965: (Soviet Union) Oleg Grigoryev
- 1967: (Romania) Nicolae Gîju
- 1969: (Romania) Aurel Dumitrescu
- 1971: (Hungary) Tibor Badari
- 1973: (France) Aldo Cosentino
- 1975: (Soviet Union) Viktor Rybakov
- 1977: (East Germany) Stefan Förster
- 1979: (Soviet Union) Nikolay Chrapzov
- 1981: (Soviet Union) Viktor Miroshnichenko
- 1983: (Soviet Union) Yuri Alexandrov
- 1985: (Socialist Federal Republic of Yugoslavia) Ljubiša Simić
- 1987: (Bulgaria) Aleksandar Khristov
- 1989: (Bulgaria) Serafim Todorov
- 1991: (Bulgaria) Serafim Todorov
- 1993: (Russia) Raimkul Malakhbekov
- 1996: (Hungary) István Kovács
- 1998: (Ukraine) Serhiy Danylchenko
- 2000: (Turkey) Agasi Agaguloglu
- 2002: (Belarus) Khavazhi Khatsigov
- 2004: (Russia) Gennady Kovalev
- 2006: (Russia) Ali Aliyev
- 2008: (England) Luke Campbell
- 2010: (Russia) Eduard Abzalimov
- 2011: (Moldova) Veaceslav Gojan
- 2013: (Republic of Ireland) John Joe Nevin
- 2015: (Republic of Ireland) Michael Conlan
- 2017: (England) Peter McGrail
- 2019: (Republic of Ireland) Kurt Walker
- 2022:

== Kickboxing ==
In kickboxing, a bantamweight fighter generally weighs between 53 kg (116 lb) and 55 kg (120 lb). However, some governing bodies have slightly different classes. For example, the International Kickboxing Federation (IKF) Bantamweight division (professional and amateur) is 117.1 lbs.–122 lbs. or 53.22 kg–55.45 kg.

In ONE Championship, the bantamweight division limit is 65.8 kg (145 lb).

== Bare-knuckle boxing ==
The bantamweight division limit generally differs among bare-knuckle boxing promotions:

- In Bare Knuckle Fighting Championship, the bantamweight division has an upper limit of 135 lb (61 kg).
- In BKB, the bantamweight division has an upper limit of 73 kg (161 lb).

== Lethwei ==
In International Lethwei Federation Japan, the bantamweight division is up to 60 kg (130 lb). In International Lethwei Federation Japan, Yuta Hamamoto is the Bantamweight Champion.

The World Lethwei Championship recognizes the bantamweight division with an upper limit of 54 kg (119 lb). In World Lethwei Championship, Souris Manfredi is the Bantamweight Champion.

== Mixed martial arts ==
In MMA, bantamweight is usually 126–135 pounds (57.2–61.2 kg). In ONE Championship, the bantamweight division limit is 65.8 kg (145 lb). In Shooto, the limit is 56 kg (123.4 lb).

=== Current champions ===
These tables were last updated in December of 2025.

Active title reign
Active title reign (interim)

Men:

Organization	Reign Began	Champion	Record	Defenses
UFC	December 6, 2025	(Russia) Petr Yan	20-5-0 (7KO 1SUB)	0
ONE Championship	December 6, 2025	(Mongolia) Enkh-Orgil Baatarkhuu	14-3-0 (3KO 6SUB)	0
Rizin FF	September 29, 2024	(Japan) Naoki Inoue	20-4-0 (2KO 9SUB)	2
Absolute Championship Akhmat	February 28, 2025	(Brazil) Josiel Silva	23-7-0 (12KO 2SUB)	1
Brave Combat Federation	November 7, 2025	(Serbia) Borislav Nikolić	15-2-0 (6KO 8SUB)	0
Konfrontacja Sztuk Walki	January 25, 2025	(Poland) Sebastian Przybysz	14-4-0 (1) (5KO 5SUB)	1
CFFC	July 18, 2025	(Cuba) Sean Mora	7-1-0 (1KO 2SUB)	0
Cage Warriors	November 25, 2023	(United Kingdom) Liam Gittins	13-5-0 (7KO 3SUB)	2
Pancrase	December 24, 2023	(Japan) Tokitaka Nakanishi	12-4-0 (1KO 5SUB)	0
Jungle Fight	June 24, 2023	(Brazil) Tiago Pereira	9-0-0 (3KO 3SUB)	3
Legacy Fighting Alliance	November 14, 2025	(Kazakhstan) Artem Belakh	11-2-0 (2KO 7SUB)	0
Shooto	September 21, 2025	(Japan) Kanata Nagai	9-0-1 (3KO 1SUB)	0
Oktagon MMA	N/A	Vacant	N/A	N/A
DEEP	March 29, 2024	(Japan) Ryuka Fukuda	25-9-1 (12KO 1SUB)	1

Women:

Organization	Reign Began	Champion	Record	Defenses
UFC	June 7, 2025	(United States) Kayla Harrison	19–1–0 (6KO 8SUB)	0
Invicta FC	December 13, 2024	(Brazil) Jennifer Maia	23-10-0 (1) (4KO 5SUB)	0
CFFC	July 18, 2025	(Brazil) Emily Martins	4-1-0 (0KO 4SUB)	0
Deep Jewels	N/A	Vacant	N/A	N/A
Legacy Fighting Alliance	N/A	Vacant	N/A	N/A
Jungle Fight	N/A	Vacant	N/A	N/A
Oktagon MMA	August 9, 2025	(Slovakia) Lucia Szabová	10-0-0 (3KO 5SUB)	0

== Muay Thai ==
In Muay Thai, bantamweight is 115–118 pounds (52.2-53.5 kg). A notable Muai Thai bantamweight fighter is Randy Thong Phoun Phim.

== Wrestling ==
Wrestling also has similar weight classes including bantamweight.

== See also ==
- Reigning boxing champions
