= Robeisy Ramírez =

Cuban Boxer (born 1993)

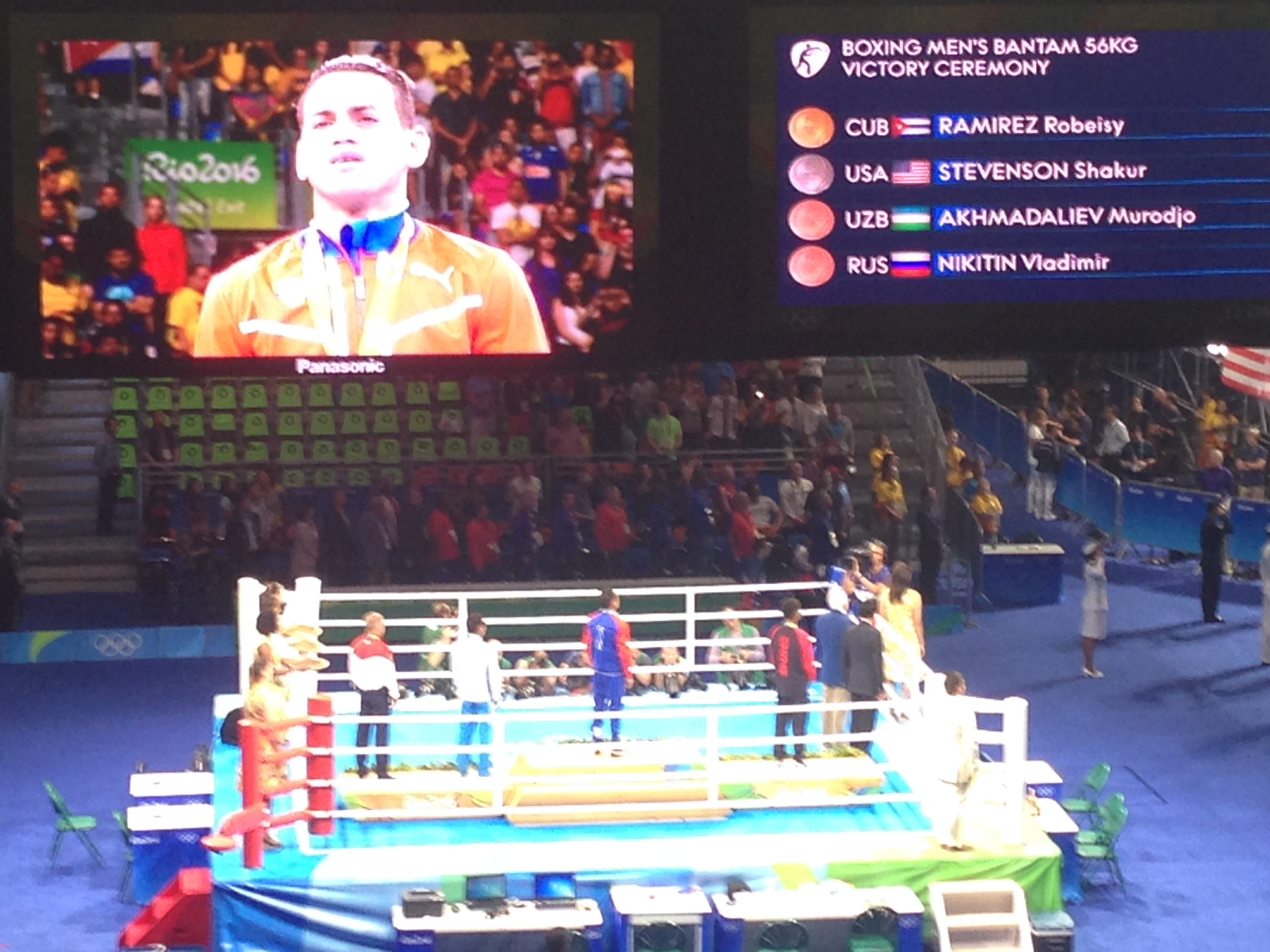

Personal information
- Nickname: El Tren ("The Train")
- Born: Robeisy Eloy Ramírez Carrazana; 20 December 1993 (age 32) Cienfuegos, Cuba
- Height: 5 ft 6 in (168 cm)
- Weight: Featherweight

Boxing career
- Reach: 68 in (173 cm)
- Stance: Southpaw

Boxing record
- Total fights: 17
- Wins: 14
- Win by KO: 9
- Losses: 3
Medal record
Men's amateur boxing
Representing Cuba
Olympic Games
Gold medal – first place	2012 London	Flyweight
Gold medal – first place	2016 Rio de Janeiro	Bantamweight
Pan American Games
Gold medal – first place	2011 Guadalajara	Flyweight
Central American and Caribbean Games
Gold medal – first place	2014 Veracruz	Bantamweight
Youth Olympic Games
Gold medal – first place	2010 Singapore	Bantamweight
AIBA Youth World Boxing Championships
Gold medal – first place	2010 Baku	Bantamweight

Robeisy Eloy Ramírez Carrazana (born 20 December 1993) is a Cuban professional boxer who held the World Boxing Organization (WBO) featherweight title in 2023. As an amateur, Ramírez won gold medals at the 2012 and 2016 Olympics.

== Amateur career ==
=== Highlights ===
Summer Olympic results London 2012

- Round of 32: Defeated Katsuaki Susa (Japan) 19–7
- Round of 16: Defeated Chatchai-decha Butdee (Thailand) 22–10
- Quarter-finals: Defeated Andrew Selby (Great Britain) 16–11
- Semi-finals: Defeated Michael Conlan (Republic of Ireland) 20–10
- Final: Defeated Tugstsogt Nyambayar (Mongolia) 17–14

Rio 2016

- Round of 32: Defeated Shiva Thapa (India) 3–0
- Round of 16: Defeated Mohamed Hamout (Morocco) 2–1
- Quarter-finals: Defeated Zhang Jiawei (China) 3–0
- Semi-finals: Defeated Murodjon Akhmadaliev (Uzbekistan) 3–0
- Final: Defeated Shakur Stevenson (USA) 2–1

Summer Youth Olympics results Singapore 2010

- Preliminaries: Defeated Stan Nicette (Seychelles) 17–3
- Semi-finals: Defeated Dawid Michelus (Poland) 3–1
- Final: Shiva Thapa (India) 5–2

Pan American Games results Guadalajara 2011

- Quarter-finals: Defeated John Franklin (USA) RSC 3
- Semi-finals: Defeated Braulio Ávila (Mexico) 20–7
- Final: Defeated Dagoberto Aguero (Dominican Republic) 24–10

== Defection ==
In July 2018, Ramírez left a Cuban National Team training camp in Aguascalientes, Mexico. The Cuban National Sports Institute stated on its official website that Ramírez was "turning his back" on the team and that "Attitudes like this are far from our values and the discipline that characterises our sport". It was thought that Ramírez had defected from Cuba to become professional, following the likes of Guillermo Rigondeaux, Luiz Ortiz, Yuriorkis Gamboa and Erislandy Lara who had also defected from Cuba to become professional.

== Professional career ==
=== Early career ===
On 24 May 2019, Ramírez signed a contract to fight professionally with Top Rank. His promoter Bob Arum stated "The last two-time gold medalist that we signed out of the amateurs, Vasyl Lomachenko, has become a big star. We anticipate the same from Robeisy".

On 10 August 2019, he made his professional debut against the little-known American, Adan Gonzales. Ramírez suffered a shock split decision defeat in which he was knocked down by a left hook inside the first minute of the opening round. His second professional fight was against Fernando Ibarra De Anda on 9 November 2019. Ramírez dominated his opponent throughout the bout and, in the final round, landed a body shot which forced Ibarra to take a knee in a neutral corner. This prompted the referee, Gerard White to end the bout immediately.

On 21 February 2020, Ramírez fought against Rafael Morales. Ramírez dominated throughout the bout and secured victory via fourth-round knockout. On 9 June 2020, Ramírez defeated Yeuri Andujar via knockout in the first round. Ramírez knocked his opponent down with a left uppercut in the opening moments of the bout. Andujar managed to recover from the knockdown, however Ramírez swiftly hit his opponent with another left hand which put Andujar on the canvas for a second time in the bout. This caused referee Tony Weeks to end the bout instantly.

On 2 July 2020, Ramírez looked to avenge his only defeat as a professional when he fought against Adan Gonzales for a second time. Ramírez controlled the bout from the outset, and secured a dominant victory after winning every round on each of the three scorecards. On 19 September 2020, Ramírez faced Felix Caraballo. Ramírez won via wide unanimous decision after outboxing his opponent throughout the duration of the bout. Ramírez fought against Brandon Valdes in what would be his fifth bout in less than a year on 12 December 2020. Ramírez secured victory in the sixth round after trapping his opponent against the ropes and unloading a barrage of unanswered punches which forced the referee to end the bout.

Ramírez faced Ryan Lee Allen on the undercard of José Ramírez vs. Josh Taylor on 22 May 2021. In the second round, Ramírez landed a straight left hand which put his opponent on the canvas. Despite Allen recovering from the knockdown, Ramírez proceeded to control the remainder of the bout and won via unanimous decision. On 9 October 2021, Ramírez fought on the undercard of Tyson Fury vs. Deontay Wilder III, in a bout against Orlando Gonzalez Ruiz. Ramírez won via unanimous decision after hurting his opponent on multiple occasions during the fight.

Ramírez fought against Eric Donovan on the undercard of Josh Taylor vs. Jack Catterall on 26 February 2022. In the opening round, Ramírez knocked his opponent down after landing a left hand. During the second round, Donovan suffered a cut over his right eye after Ramírez landed a left uppercut. Ramírez started pressuring his opponent in the third round and eventually hit Donovan with a hard left hook which put him against the ropes. Ramírez immediately followed this up with another left hand which knocked Donovan down for a second time. Following the second knockdown, the referee called an end to the bout immediately. On 18 June 2022, Ramírez faced Abraham Nova, on the undercard of Joe Smith Jr vs. Artur Beterbiev. In the opening moments of the third round, Nova landed a right hand which knocked Ramírez off balance. Towards the end of the third round, Ramírez hurt his opponent after landing two heavy left hands. In the fifth round, Ramírez landed a straight left hand to the head of Nova which sent him to the canvas. Ramírez was declared the winner by knockout after the referee promptly ended the bout following the knockdown. Ramirez fought Jose Matias Romero on 29 October 2022. He won the fight by 9th-round technical knockout.

=== WBO featherweight champion ===
==== Ramírez vs. Dogboe ====
Ramírez was booked to face the former WBO Junior-featherweight champion Isaac Dogboe on 1 April 2023, in the headliner of an ESPN+ broadcast event, which took place in Tulsa, Oklahoma. Although it was initially scheduled as an interim title bout, the fight was upgraded to a vacant championship bout on February 9, 2023, after the reigning WBO featherweight champion Emanuel Navarrete vacated the belt in order to compete at super featherweight. He won the fight by unanimous decision, with scores of 118–109, 119–108 and 117–110. Ramírez knocked his opponent down with a left hand in the final round of the contest to score the sole knockdown of the fight.

==== Ramirez vs. Shimizu ====
Ramirez made the first defense of his WBO featherweight title against Satoshi Shimizu on 25 July 2023, on the undercard of Naoya Inoue vs. Stephen Fulton. Ramirez dominated and stopped Shimuzu in the 5th round, dropping him once before finishing him off with a flurry of unanswered punches and the referee called off the bout.

==== Ramirez vs. Espinoza ====
Making the second defense of his WBO featherweight title, Ramirez took on hard-hitting Mexican boxer Rafael "El Divino" Espinoza on the 9th of December, 2023, at the Charles F. Dodge City Center, Pembroke Pines, Florida, U.S.

Coming into the fight, Ramirez was heralded as the -1200 favorite to win, but the odds were proven wrong when Espinoza—despite suffering a knockdown himself in the second round—toughened his way to a majority decision victory over Ramirez.

=== Post-championship return ===
==== Ramírez vs. Benitez ====
Ramírez was scheduled to face Brandon Leon Benitez in a 10-round featherweight bout at James L. Knight Center in Miami, FL on June 29, 2024. Ramírez won the fight via stoppage in the seventh round.

=== WBO featherweight championship rematch ===
==== Ramírez vs. Espinoza 2 ====
Ramírez challenged Rafael Espinoza for WBO featherweight title in a championship rematch at Footprint Center in Phoenix, AZ on December 7, 2024. Ramírez lost the fight by TKO in the 6th round.

=== Leaving Top Rank; SIgning with Raizd Boxing ===
In March 2026, Ramírez took to X, to announce that he was a promotional free agent, after his contract with Top Rank had expired. On April 28, Ramirez signed with new promotional company Raizd Boxing. At the time, they were yet to put on an event.

== Professional boxing record ==
17 fights	14 wins	3 losses
By knockout	9	1
By decision	5	2

No.	Result	Record	Opponent	Type	Round, time	Date	Location	Notes
17	Loss	14–3	Rafael Espinoza	TKO	6 (12), 0:12	7 Dec 2024	Footprint Center, Phoenix, Arizona, U.S.	For WBO featherweight title
16	Win	14–2	Brandon Leon Benitez	KO	7 (10)	29 Jun 2024	James L. Knight Center, Miami Beach, Florida, US	Won NABO featherweight title
15	Loss	13–2	Rafael Espinoza	MD	12	9 Dec 2023	Charles F. Dodge City Center, Pembroke Pines, Florida, US	Lost WBO featherweight title
14	Win	13–1	Satoshi Shimizu	TKO	5 (12) 1:08	25 Jul 2023	Ariake Arena, Tokyo, Japan	Retained WBO featherweight title
13	Win	12–1	Isaac Dogboe	UD	12	1 Apr 2023	Hard Rock Hotel & Casino, Tulsa, Oklahoma, US	Won vacant WBO featherweight title
12	Win	11–1	Jose Matias Romero	TKO	9 (10), 2:20	29 Oct 2022	Hulu Theater, New York City, New York, US	
11	Win	10–1	Abraham Nova	KO	5 (10), 2:20	18 Jun 2022	Hulu Theater, New York City, New York, US	Won vacant WBO Global and USBA featherweight titles
10	Win	9–1	Eric Donovan	TKO	3 (10), 1:04	26 Feb 2022	OVO Hydro, Glasgow, Scotland	
9	Win	8–1	Orlando Gonzalez Ruiz	UD	10	9 Oct 2021	T-Mobile Arena, Paradise, Nevada, US	Won vacant NABF junior featherweight title
8	Win	7–1	Ryan Lee Allen	UD	6	22 May 2021	Virgin Hotels Las Vegas, Paradise, Nevada, US	
7	Win	6–1	Brandon Valdes	TKO	6 (8), 2:58	12 Dec 2020	MGM Grand Conference Center, Paradise, Nevada, US	
6	Win	5–1	Felix Caraballo	UD	8	19 Sep 2020	MGM Grand Conference Center, Paradise, Nevada, US	
5	Win	4–1	Adan Gonzales	UD	6	2 Jul 2020	MGM Grand Conference Center, Paradise, Nevada, US	
4	Win	3–1	Yeuri Andujar	TKO	1 (6), 0:54	9 Jun 2020	MGM Grand Conference Center, Paradise, Nevada, US	
3	Win	2–1	Rafeal Morales	KO	4 (6), 2:59	21 Feb 2020	Miccosukee Indian Gaming Resort, Miami, Florida, US	
2	Win	1–1	Fernando Ibarra De Anda	KO	6 (6), 1:37	9 Nov 2019	Chukchansi Park, Fresno, California, US	
1	Loss	0–1	Adan Gonzales	SD	4	10 Aug 2019	Liacouras Center, Philadelphia, Pennsylvania, US	

== See also ==
- List of world featherweight boxing champions
- List of southpaw stance boxers
- List of Olympic medalists in boxing
- List of Youth Olympic Games gold medalists who won Olympic gold medals

Sporting positions
Regional boxing titles
Vacant Title last held by Adam Lopez	NABF junior featherweight champion 9 October 2021 – 2022; Vacated	Vacant
Vacant Title last held by Brock Jarvis	WBO Global featherweight title 18 June 2022 – 2022; Vacated	Vacant
Vacant Title last held by Jose Haro	USBA featherweight title 18 June 2022 – 2022; Vacated	Vacant
World boxing titles
Vacant Title last held by Emanuel Navarrete	WBO featherweight champion 1 April 2023 – 9 December 2023	Succeeded by Rafael Espinoza
