= Shiva Thapa =

Indian boxer (born 1993)

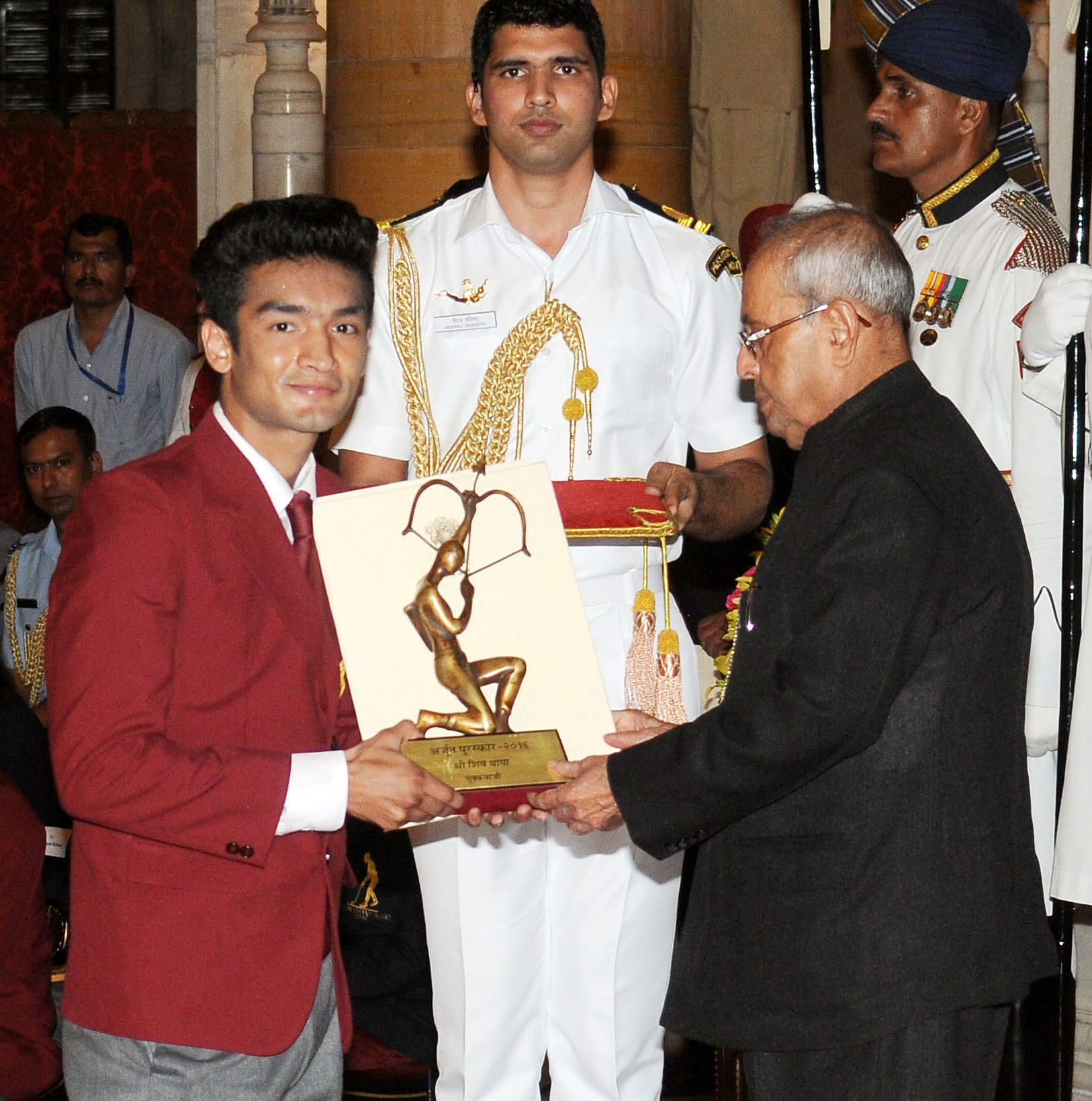

Personal information
- Nationality: India
- Born: Shiva Thapa; 8 December 1993 (age 32) Guwahati, Assam, India
- Weight: Bantamweight (54 kg)

Boxing career

Boxing record
- Win by KO: 1
Medal record
Men's amateur boxing
Representing India
World Championships
Bronze medal – third place	2015 Doha	Bantamweight
Asian Championships
Gold medal – first place	2013 Amman	Bantamweight
Silver medal – second place	2017 Tashkent	Lightweight
Silver medal – second place	2021 Dubai	Light welterweight
Silver medal – second place	2022 Amman	Light welterweight
Bronze medal – third place	2015 Bangkok	Bantamweight
Bronze medal – third place	2019 Bangkok	Lightweight

Shiva Thapa (born 8 December 1993) is an Indian boxer. Thapa participated in the 2012 London Olympics, and was the youngest Indian boxer to qualify for the Olympics, where he was eliminated in the very first round, beaten 9–14 by Mexico's Óscar Valdez. Thapa is ranked 3rd in the bantamweight category in the AIBA Men's World Ranking. He is the third Indian to clinch gold at the Asian Games. Thapa is the third Indian boxer to win a medal at the AIBA World Boxing Championships. Thapa has been elected as a member of the International Boxing Association (amateur) Athletes Committee.

== Early life ==
Shiva Thapa is the youngest of six children born to an Indian Gorkha, Magar father Padam Thapa, a karate instructor in Guwahati. His elder brother Gobind Thapa was an Assam state-level medal winning boxer; Mike Tyson's bouts also inspired him to take the sport seriously. Shiva rose as early as 3 a.m. to balance his training and studies. Padam ensured that the monthly expenditure of ₹30,000 (US$320) was taken care of. Olympic Gold Quest, a not-for-profit foundation to identify and support Indian athletes, decided to support the young boxer as a part of their Vision 2016 initiative. While signing Thapa, Viren Rasquinha, the chief operating officer of Olympic Gold Quest said:

Shiva is an enormous talent. He must be groomed well because he has the talent, the right attitude and the hunger to succeed. OGQ has very high hopes from Shiva and I am confident that he will become one of India's top boxing stars in the near future.

== Career ==
=== Amateur career ===
At the 2008 Children Asia International Sports Games that was held in Yakutsk (Russia) Shiva Thapa won a bronze medal in his category. At the same year's Haider Aliyev Cup, he won the gold medal. Owing to this performance, he was chosen to represent India in the 52-kg category at the 2009 Junior World Boxing Championships in Armenia. Incidentally, Thapa was the lone international medalist from the team of seven boxers that travelled to Yerevan. Though Thapa ended up with a bronze medal, the coach expressed his satisfaction at the boxers' performance who returned with their biggest haul of medals from this competition.

At the 2010 Asian Youth Boxing Championships in Tehran, Thapa failed to reach the semifinals in his category. At the Second Youth World Amateur Boxing Championships, Thapa was a part of the Indian team. This competition attracted a large number of boxers because it was the only qualification event for the 2010 Summer Youth Olympics. Touted to be a strong gold medalist, Thapa lost the finals and ended up with a silver medal. An injured fist during the semifinal bout left him in poor shape before the final bout. After having qualified for the Summer Youth Olympics, the Indian coach suggested Thapa with a 20-day break to recover from his injury. At the Youth Olympics, Thapa won the silver medal in the 54-kg category after losing to a Cuban boxer in the finals.

==== Qualification to 2012 London Olympics ====
In 2012 Asian Olympic Qualifiers held in Astana, Kazakhstan, Shiva defeated Syria's Wessam Salamana 18–11 to clinch the gold medal and qualified for 2012 London Olympics in 56 kg category. Thapa is the youngest Indian boxer to qualify for Olympics. He, however, lost in the first round of the London Olympics, losing 9–14 to Mexico's Oscar Valdez Fierro in the (56 kg) Bantamweight category.

=== Appreciation ===
The Government of Assam rewarded him with ₹100,000 (US$1,100). The Indian Olympic Association awarded him with ₹400,000 (US$4,300) while congratulating him for his silver medal at the Youth Olympics, and government of Sikkim awarded him 500,000 rupees cash.

=== 2013 ===
In July 2013, Shiva became the youngest Indian to win a gold at the Asian Confederation Boxing Championship at Amman, Jordan. Shiva Thapa participated in the 2013 World Boxing Championships, which was held at Almaty, Kazakhstan and on his debut Shiva reached the quarterfinals of the World Championship. Thapa became one of the first boxers from India to get a World Series of Boxing Contract. Maneesh Bahuguna, the CEO of his managing firm, Anglian Medal Hunt Company was quoted as having said, "Shiva’s outstanding achievements made him an undisputed choice for WSB. At such a young age, he has undeviating focus and love for his sport." Shiva Thapa has been ranked 3rd in the bantamweight category in the latest AIBA Men's World Ranking.

In 2013, Thapa was named 'Assamese of the Year' and was also given the ICC Sports Excellence Award.

=== 2014 ===
Shiva Thapa had his first bout under World Series of Boxing USA Knockouts against Ukraine Ottoman's Mykola Butsenko, World Championship Bronze medalist in Miami, Florida. He fought the second bout against Team Germany's Edgar Walth in Frankfurt.

He was featured as one of the new youth leaders in India Today's '2014 Power of the New'. Thapa is a consistent promoter of social causes, having participated in charity walkathons and marathons.

He failed to get medals in both Commonwealth Games and Asian Games losing the bout in first round and quarterfinals respectively. Contradiction arise as the chance was not provided for better boxer Balakrishna Vankala of Southern Railways to participate in the Asian Games.

=== 2015 ===
Shiva Thapa became only 3rd Indian to win a medal at AIBA World Boxing Championships when he won bronze.

=== 2016 ===
Shiva Thapa qualified for the 2016 Rio Olympic in the Men's 56 kg event, but failed to move beyond the first round after suffering a 0–3 defeat to eventual gold medalist Robeisy Ramírez of Cuba.

=== 2017 ===
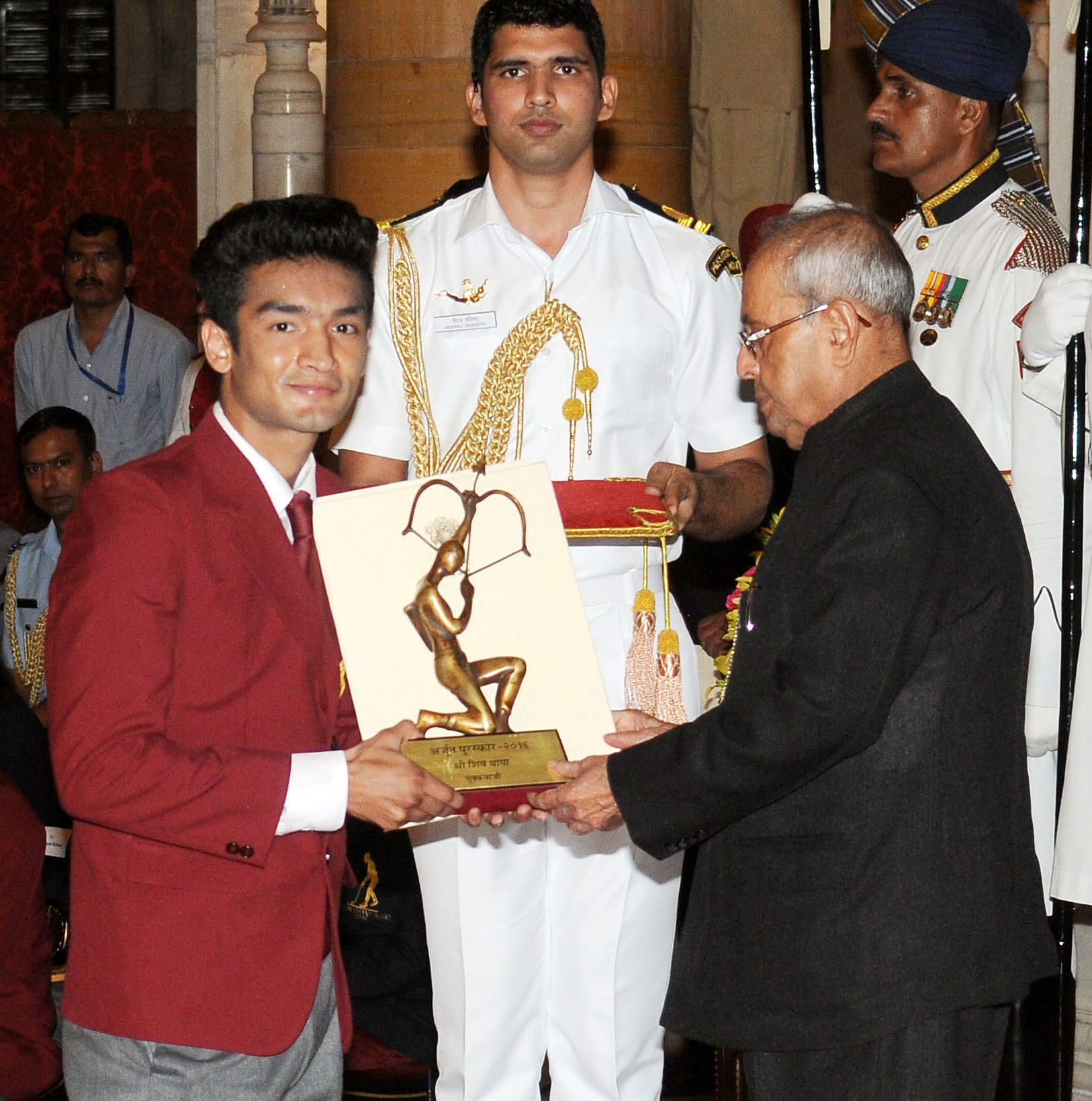
The President, Shri Pranab Mukherjee presenting the Arjuna Award for the year-2016 to Shri Shiva Thapa for Boxing, in a glittering ceremony, at Rashtrapati Bhavan, in New Delhi on 29 August 2016

Shiva Thapa won silver at 2017 Asian Amateur Boxing Championships in Tashkent after an injury-forced loss to second seed and local favourite Elnur Abduraimov.

2019

He won gold medal at 2019 Tokyo Olympic test event by defeating Kazakhstan's national champion and Asian bronze-winner Sanatali Toltayev 5–0.

== Personal life ==
He is employed with Oil and Natural Gas Corporation Ltd. He is supported by Olympic Gold Quest and Anglian Medal Hunt Company.
