= Mykola Butsenko =

Ukrainian amateur boxer

Personal information
- Full name: Mykola Valeriyovych Butsenko
- Nationality: Ukrainian
- Born: 25 June 1991 (age 35) Odesa, Ukrainian SSR, Soviet Union

Sport
- Sport: Boxing
- Weight class: Bantamweight
Medal record
Men's amateur boxing
Representing Ukraine
World Championships
Bronze medal – third place	2013 Almaty	Bantamweight
European Games
Silver medal – second place	2019 Minsk	Bantamweight
European Championships
Silver medal – second place	2013 Minsk	Bantamweight
Silver medal – second place	2017 Kharkiv	Bantamweight

Mykola Valeriyovych Butsenko (Ukrainian: Микола Валерійович Буценко, born 25 June 1991) is a Ukrainian amateur boxer who competes in the bantamweight division. In the quarterfinals of the 2013 AIBA World Boxing Championships he defeated Selçuk Eker of Turkey to win his 1st medal at the World Championships. He is also a two-time European silver medalist. He participated at the 2016 Summer Olympscs where he lost his first bout against Mohamed Hamout from Morocco.

== Amateur career ==
In June 2021, Butsenko qualified to participate in the Summer Olympics in Tokyo for Ukraine. In addition to him, Yaroslav Khartsyz, Yevhen Barabanov, Oleksandr Khyzhniak, Tsotne Rogava were included in the men's grid of Ukrainian representatives, and Hanna Lysenko entered the women's grid.
