= Selçuk Eker =

Turkish boxer (born 1991)

Personal information
- Nationality: Turkish
- Born: December 18, 1991 (age 34) Gebze, Kocaeli Province, Turkey
- Height: 1.63 m (5 ft 4 in)
- Weight: 52 kg (115 lb)

Sport
- Country: Turkey
- Sport: Amateur boxing
- Event: Flyweight
- Club: Kocaeli Büyükşehir Belediyesi Kağıt Spor Kulübü, Izmit
- Coached by: Serkan Bal

Selçuk Eker (pronounced [selˈtʃuc eˈkeɾ]; born December 18, 1991, in Gebze, Kocaeli Province, Turkey) is a Turkish amateur boxer competing in the flyweight division. The 1.63 m (5.3 ft) tall athlete at 52 kg (115 lb) is a member of Kocaeli Büyükşehir Belediyesi Kağıt Spor Kulübü in Izmit.

He qualified for the 2012 Summer Olympics after winning the silver medal at the 2012 European Boxing Olympic Qualification Tournament held in Trabzon, Turkey.

At the 2012 Olympics, he lost in the first round to Chatchai Butdee.

Eker qualified for the 2016 Olympics, but again lost in the first round, this time to Hu Jianguan.
