= Aram Avagyan =

Armenian boxer (born 1991)

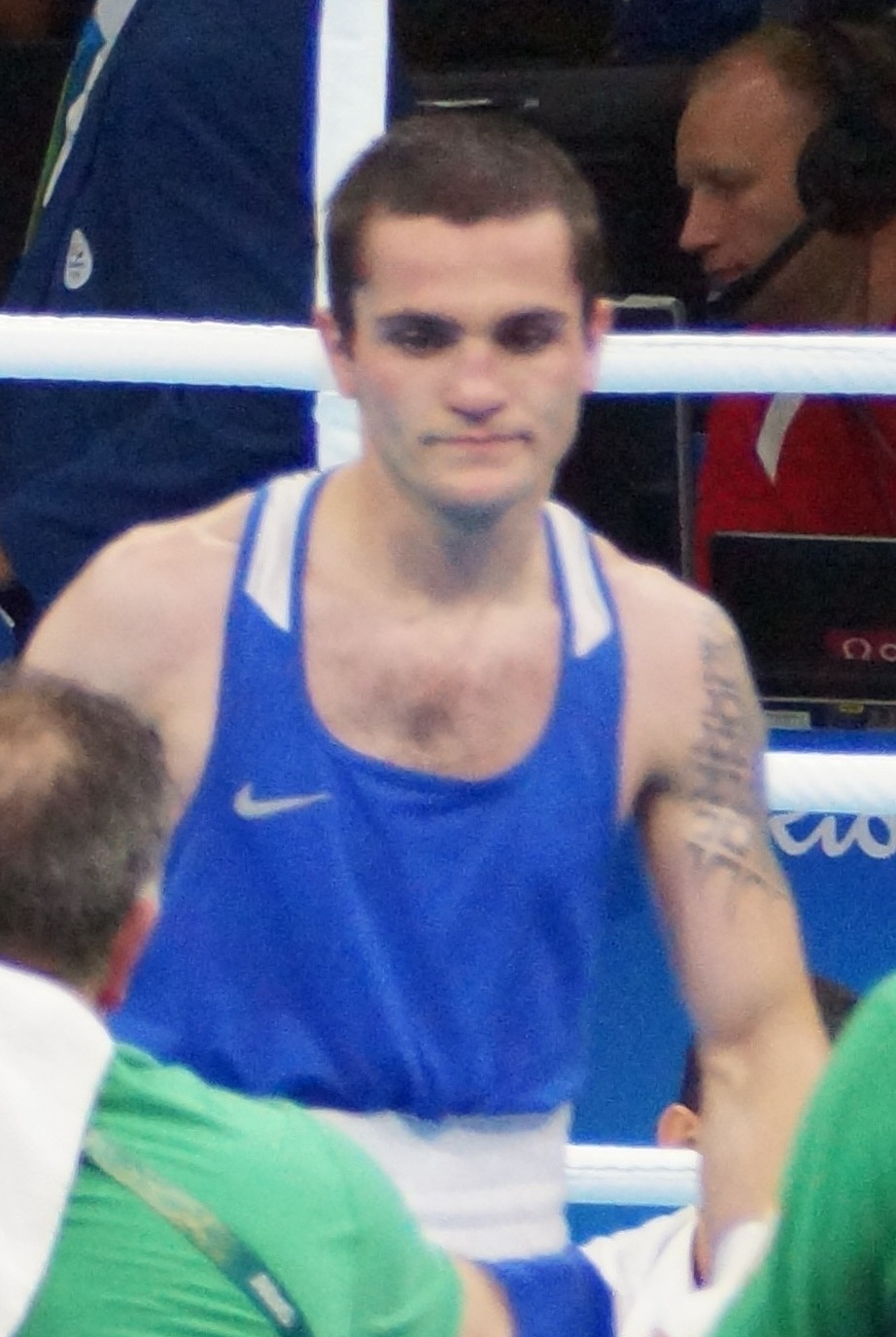
- Avagyan at the 2016 Olympics

Personal information
- Nickname: Warrior
- Nationality: Armenian
- Born: 18 January 1991 (age 35) Yerevan, Armenia
- Height: 173 cm (5 ft 8 in)

Sport
- Sport: Boxing
- Club: Hayastan Sport Unity Boxing club
- Coached by: Karen Aghamalyan
Medal record
Men's amateur boxing
Representing Armenia
European Amateur Boxing Championships
Bronze medal – third place	2013 Minsk	-56 kg
Bronze medal – third place	2015 Samokov	-56 kg

Aram Avagyan (Armenian: Արամ Ավագյան; born 18 January 1991 in Yerevan) is an Armenian professional boxer who held the WBC International Silver featherweight title from 2018 to 2019. As an amateur, he won bronze medals at the European championships in 2013 and 2015 as a bantamweight. He was eliminated in the second bout at the 2016 Olympics. Avagyan studied criminology at the Russian Armenian University in Yerevan.

== Professional boxing record ==
15 fights	11 wins	1 loss
By knockout	5	0
By decision	6	1
Draws	3	

No.	Result	Record	Opponent	Type	Round, time	Date	Location	Notes
13	Loss	10–1–2	(United States) Martino Jules	UD	8	23 July 2021	(United States) Heartland Events Center, Grand Island, Nebraska, U.S.	
12	Draw	10–0–2	(Panama) Jose Nunez	MD	8	21 Jan 2021	(United States) Mohegan Sun Casino, Uncasville, Connecticut, U.S.	
11	Win	10–0–1	(Dominican Republic) Dagoberto Aguero	MD	8	13 Mar 2020	(United States) Grand Casino, Hinckley, Minnesota, U.S.	
10	Win	9–0–1	(United States) Francisco Esparza	UD	10	4 May 2019	(United States) T-Mobile Arena, Paradise, Nevada, U.S.	Retained WBC International Silver featherweight title
9	Draw	8–0–1	(Russia) Evgeny Smirnov	SD	10	21 Sep 2018	Boxing & Gym Academy, Moscow, Russia	Retained WBC International Silver featherweight title
9	Win	8–0	(Mexico) Emanuel Lopez	UD	10	19 May 2018	Pabellón Esperanza Lag, Elche, Spain	Won vacant WBC International Silver featherweight title
7	Win	7–0	(Uzbekistan) Burgut Hodjiboyev	UD	6	17 Mar 2018	Floyd Mayweather Boxing Academy, Zhukovka, Russia	
6	Win	6–0	(Georgia (country)) Dato Nanava	RTD	4 (8), 3:00	24 Nov 2017	Pabellón Municipal, Sedaví, Spain	
5	Win	5–0	(Ukraine) Bohdan Zemlianyi	TKO	3 (8), 1:57	30 Sep 2017	Sports Palace Quant, Moscow, Russia	
4	Win	4–0	(Russia) Alexander Saltykov	TKO	4 (6), 1:56	4 Aug 2017	Circus, Sochi, Russia	
3	Win	3–0	(Uzbekistan) Sharobiddin Jurakhonov	UD	8	27 May 2017	Event-Hall, Solnechnyy, Russia	
2	Win	2–0	(Russia) Anton Mezhuev	RTD	3 (6), 3:00	25 Feb 2017	Event-Hall, Solnechnyy, Russia	
1	Win	1–0	(Belarus) Andrei Nurchynski	UD	6	18 Dec 2016	Balagan City Club, Voronezh, Russia	
