= Zhang Jiawei =

Chinese boxer

Zhang Jiawei (born 1989) is a Chinese boxer who took the silver medal in the flyweight division at the Asian Games in 2010. He won the Bocskai Memorial Tournament in 2010. He competed in the men's bantamweight event at the 2016 Summer Olympics, where he reached the quarterfinals.
