= Robenílson de Jesus =

Brazilian boxer

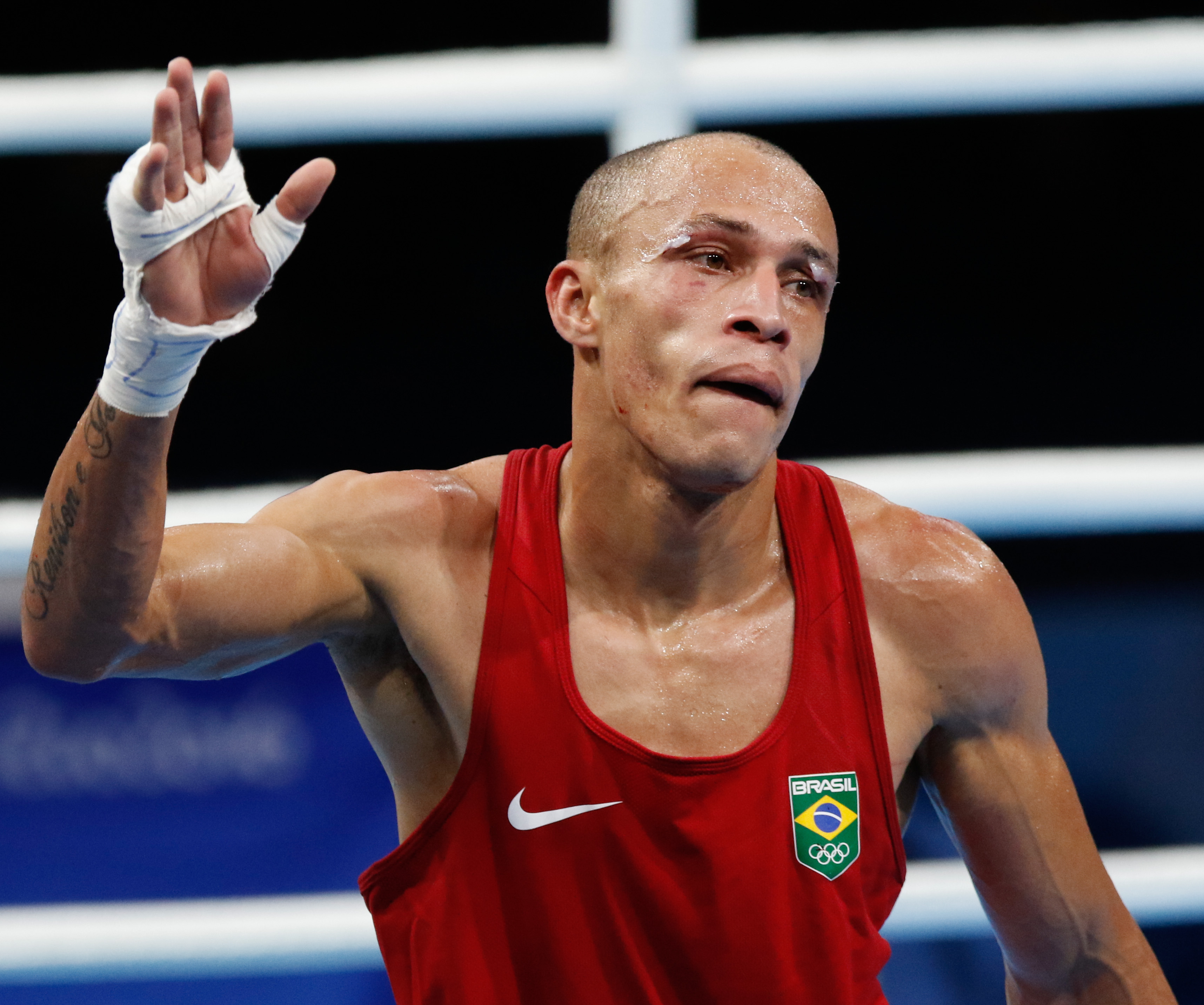
- Robenílson de Jesus at the 2016 Olympics

Personal information
- Born: September 24, 1987 (age 38) Salvador, Bahia, Brazil
- Height: 166 cm (5 ft 5 in)

Sport
- Country: Brazil
- Sport: Boxing
- Event: Bantamweight
- Club: Associação Champion
- Coached by: Luiz Dórea (club); Mateus Alves (national)
Medal record
Men's amateur boxing
Representing Brazil
Pan American Games
Silver medal – second place	2011 Guadalajara	-56 kg
- Updated on 29 July 2012

Robenílson Vieira de Jesus (born September 24, 1987) is an amateur boxer from Brazil who won a silver medal at the 2011 Pan American Games. He competed at the 2008, 2012 and 2016 Summer Olympics, but did not win a medal on either of the three occasions.

== Professional boxing record ==
4 Wins (3 decisions and 1 K.O.), 1 Loss, 0 Draws
Res.	Record	Opponent	Type	Rd., Time	Date	Location	Notes
Loss	5–1	(Puerto Rico) Jaycob Bradley Gomez Zayas	UD	6	2023-10-18	(United States) Whitesands Events Center, Plant City, Florida, U.S.	Super featherweight debut.
Win	5–0	(Brazil) Paulo Henrique Martins de França	UD	6	2022-11-19	(Brazil) Centro de Treinamento Waldemar Santana, Salvador	
Win	4–0	(Brazil) Eric dos Santos de Jesus	TKO	3 (6)	2022-08-26	(Brazil) Ginásio de Esportes, Lauro de Freitas	Featherweight debut.
Win	3–0	(Chile) Robinson Lavinanza	UD	8	2019-08-11	(Brazil) Arena das Lutas, São Paulo	Super bantamweight debut.
Win	2–0	(Brazil) Agnaldo Valerio Martins	UD	6	2019-03-31	(Brazil) Portobello Resort & Safari, Mangaratiba, Rio de Janeiro	
Win	1–0	(Brazil) Claudinei de Souza	UD	6	2017-06-17	(Brazil) Hotel Golden Park, Sorocaba, São Paulo	Professional boxing debut at Featherweight.
