= Chatchai-decha Butdee =

Thai boxer (born 1985)

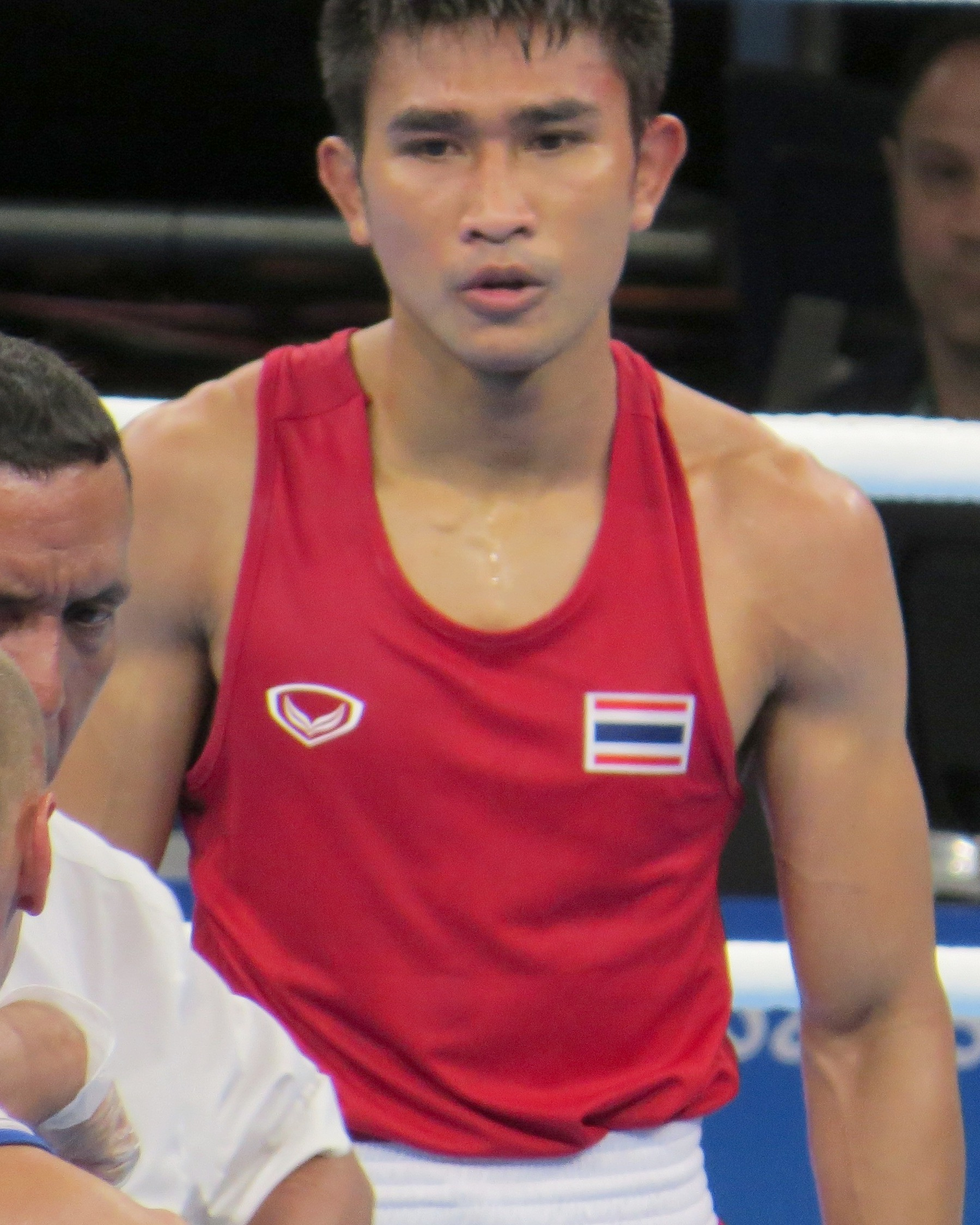
- Butdee at the 2016 Olympics

Personal information
- Born: 26 March 1985 (age 41) Ta Phraya, Prachinburi (now Sa Kaeo), Thailand
- Height: 166 cm (5 ft 5 in)

Sport
- Sport: Amateur boxing
- Club: The 1st Army Arai Boxing Club
- Coached by: Omar Malagon
Medal record
Representing Thailand
World Amateur Championships
Bronze medal – third place	2013 Almaty	Flyweight
Asian Championships
Gold medal – first place	2015 Bangkok	Bantamweight
Southeast Asia Games
Gold medal – first place	2009 Vientiane	Bantamweight
Gold medal – first place	2013 Naypyidaw	Flyweight
Gold medal – first place	2017 Malaysia	Bantamweight
Gold medal – first place	2019 Philippines	Bantamweight
Silver medal – second place	2011 Indonesia	Flyweight

Chatchai-decha Butdee (Thai: ฉัตร์ชัยเดชา บุตรดี, RTGS: Chatchaidecha Butdi, pronounced [t͡ɕʰàt.t͡ɕʰāj.dēː.t͡ɕʰāː bùt.dīː]), formerly Chatchai Butdee (ฉัตร์ชัย บุตรดี, RTGS: Chatchai Butdi, [tɕʰàt.tɕʰāj bùt.dīː]; born 26 March 1985), is a Thai southpaw boxer who won a bronze medal at the 2013 World Championships. At the 2012 Summer Olympics, competing in the flyweight, he was defeated in his second bout. At the 2016 Summer Olympics, Butdee was again eliminated in his second bout. In Muay Thai he was known as Thapraya KimichiangKorsang (Thai: ตาพระยา กิมเชียงก่อสร้าง

== Biography and career ==
Butdee is married and has one daughter. He has a degree in public administration from Thongsook College and is a fan of the English football club Arsenal F.C. In 2013 he was named the Male Athlete of the Year by the Sports Authority of Thailand.

Butdee has an affiliation with the 1st Army Arai Boxing Club, Thailand.

After being eliminated in the quarterfinals of the 2020 Summer Olympics featherweight (losing 3-2 to Cuba's Lázaro Álvarez), he announced his retirement at the age of 36 after having competed in three Summer Olympics.

== Muay Thai record ==
Muaythai record
Date	Result	Opponent	Event	Location	Method	Round	Time
2004-11-11	Loss	(Thailand) Mekpayak Lukhuanghin	Onesongchai, Rajadamnern Stadium	Bangkok, Thailand	Decision	5	3:00
2004-03-04	Win	(Thailand) Prawit Tor.Silachai	Onesongchai, Rajadamnern Stadium	Bangkok, Thailand	KO	2	
2003-08-28	Loss	(Thailand) Aikpracha Meenayothin	Rajadamnern Stadium	Bangkok, Thailand	Decision	5	3:00
2003-	Loss	(Thailand) Aikpracha Meenayothin		Bangkok, Thailand	Decision	5	3:00
2003-	Loss	(Thailand) Aikpracha Meenayothin		Bangkok, Thailand	Decision	5	3:00
Legend: Win Loss Draw/No contest Notes
