= Boxing at the 2020 Summer Olympics – Men's flyweight =

Men's flyweight at the Games of the XXXII Olympiad
- Boxing pictogram
- Venue: Ryōgoku Kokugikan
- Dates: 26 July – 7 August 2021
- Competitors: 27 from 27 nations

Medalists
1st place, gold medalist(s)		Galal Yafai	Great Britain
2nd place, silver medalist(s)		Carlo Paalam	Philippines
3rd place, bronze medalist(s)		Ryomei Tanaka	Japan
3rd place, bronze medalist(s)		Saken Bibossinov	Kazakhstan

The men's flyweight boxing event at the 2020 Summer Olympics took place between 26 July and 7 August 2021 at the Ryōgoku Kokugikan. 28 boxers from 28 nations are expected to compete.

== Background ==
This was the 24th appearance of the men's flyweight event. The event appeared at the first Olympic boxing tournament in 1904, was not held in 1908, and then has been held at every Games with boxing since (1920 through 2020). The 2020 tournament was the first since 1964 that flyweight is the lightest men's weight class; the men's light flyweight class was eliminated after 2016 as the sport moved toward gender equality. The weight range for the class was changed from 49–52 kg to 48–52 kg.

Reigning Olympic champion and World Champion Shakhobidin Zoirov of Uzbekistan had qualified to make an Olympic title defense in Tokyo. Zoirov is a professional and has a 3–0 record.

== Qualification ==
A National Olympic Committee (NOC) could enter only 1 qualified boxer in the weight class. There were 28 quota places available for the men's flyweight, allocated as follows:

- 1 place for the host nation, Japan.
- 3 places at the 2020 African Boxing Olympic Qualification Tournament.
- 6 places at the 2020 Asia & Oceania Boxing Olympic Qualification Tournament.
- 8 places at the 2020 European Boxing Olympic Qualification Tournament.
- 5 places that were intended to be awarded at the 2021 Pan American Boxing Olympic Qualification Tournament, which was cancelled. These places were instead awarded through the world ranking list to the top boxers from the Americas who had been registered for the qualification tournament.
- 4 places that were intended to be awarded at a World Olympic Qualifying Tournament, which was cancelled. These places were instead awarded through the world ranking list, with one place for each continental zone (Africa, Asia & Oceania, Europe, Americas).
- 1 place for a Tripartite Commission invitation.

Thitisan Panmod from Thailand withdrew before the competition.

== Competition format ==
Like all Olympic boxing events, the competition is a straight single-elimination tournament. The competition begins with a preliminary round, where the number of competitors is reduced to 16, and concludes with a final. As there are fewer than 32 boxers in the competition, a number of boxers will receive a bye through the preliminary round. Both semi-final losers are awarded bronze medals.

Bouts consist of three three-minute rounds with a one-minute break between rounds. A boxer may win by knockout or by points. Scoring is on the "10-point-must," with 5 judges scoring each round. Judges consider "number of blows landed on the target areas, domination of the bout, technique and tactical superiority and competitiveness." Each judge determines a winner for each round, who receives 10 points for the round, and assigns the round's loser a number of points between 7 and 9 based on performance. The judge's scores for each round are added to give a total score for that judge. The boxer with the higher score from a majority of the judges is the winner.

== Schedule ==
The flyweight starts with the round of 32 on 26 July. There are four rest days before the round of 16 on 31 July and two more rest days before the quarterfinals on 3 August. After that, there is only one rest day between rounds with the semifinals on 5 August and the final on 7 August.

Legend

R32	Round of 32	R16	Round of 16	QF	Quarterfinals	SF	Semifinals	F	Final

Date	Jul 24		Jul 25		Jul 26		Jul 27		Jul 28		Jul 29		Jul 30		Jul 31		Aug 1		Aug 2		Aug 3		Aug 4		Aug 5		Aug 6		Aug 7		Aug 8	
Event	A	E	A	E	A	E	A	E	A	E	A	E	A	E	A	E	A	E	A	E	A	E	A	E	A	E	A	E	A	E	A	E
Men's flyweight					R32										R16						QF				SF				F			

== Results ==
=== Finals ===
Final
Carlo Paalam (PHI)	1
Galal Yafai (GBR)	4

=== Top half ===
Round of 32
Rajab Mahommed (BOT)	0
Yuberjen Martínez (COL)	5
Hu Jianguan (CHN)	5
Sakhil Alakhverdovi (GEO)	0
Ryomei Tanaka (JPN)	5
Yoel Finol (VEN)	0
Shakhobidin Zoirov (UZB)	5
Batuhan Çiftçi (TUR)	0
Brendan Irvine (IRL)	1
Carlo Paalam (PHI)	4

Round of 16
Amit Panghal (IND)	1
Yuberjen Martínez (COL)	4
Hu Jianguan (CHN)	1
Ryomei Tanaka (JPN)	3
Daniel Varela de Pina (CPV)	0
Shakhobidin Zoirov (UZB)	5
Carlo Paalam (PHI)	5
Mohamed Flissi (ALG)	0

Quarterfinals
Yuberjen Martínez (COL)	1
Ryomei Tanaka (JPN)	4
Shakhobidin Zoirov (UZB)	0
Carlo Paalam (PHI)	4

Semifinals
Ryomei Tanaka (JPN)	0
Carlo Paalam (PHI)	5

=== Bottom half ===
Round of 32
Rodrigo Marte (DOM)	2
Sulemanu Tetteh (GHA)	3
Patrick Chinyemba (ZAM)	4
Alex Winwood (AUS)	1
Koryun Soghomonyan (ARM)
Galal Yafai (GBR)	RSC
Cosmin Girleanu (ROU)	0
Daniel Asenov (BUL)	5
Ramón Quiroga (ARG)	0
Gabriel Escobar (ESP)	5
Saken Bibossinov (KAZ)	4
Yankiel Rivera (PUR)	1

Round of 16
Yosvany Veitía (CUB)	5
Sulemanu Tetteh (GHA)	0
Patrick Chinyemba (ZAM)	2
Galal Yafai (GBR)	3
Daniel Asenov (BUL)	1
Gabriel Escobar (ESP)	4
Saken Bibossinov (KAZ)	5
Billal Bennama (FRA)	0

Quarterfinals
Yosvany Veitía (CUB)	1
Galal Yafai (GBR)	4
Gabriel Escobar (ESP)	2
Saken Bibossinov (KAZ)	3

Semifinals
Galal Yafai (GBR)	3
Saken Bibossinov (KAZ)	2
