= 2013 AIBA World Boxing Championships – Flyweight =

Boxing competitions

The Flyweight competition at the 2013 AIBA World Boxing Championships was held from 14–26 October 2013. Boxers are limited to a maximum of 52 kilograms in body mass.

== Medalists ==
Gold	Misha Aloyan (RUS)
Silver	Jasurbek Latipov (UZB)
Bronze	Andrew Selby (WAL)
Bronze	Chatchai Butdee (THA)

== Seeds ==
1. (Wales) Andrew Selby (semifinals)
2. (Russia) Misha Aloyan (champion)
3. (Mexico) Elías Emigdio (second round)
4. (Uzbekistan) Jasurbek Latipov (final)
5. (Republic of Ireland) Paddy Barnes (quarterfinals)
6. (Azerbaijan) Elvin Mamishzade (quarterfinals)
7. (Italy) Vincenzo Picardi (second round)
8. (Kazakhstan) Ilyas Suleimenov (quarterfinals)
9. (Kyrgyzstan) Azat Usenaliev (third round)
10. (Dominican Republic) Geraldo Pérez (second round)

== Draw ==
=== Finals ===
Semifinals
1	(Wales) Andrew Selby	1
4	(Uzbekistan) Jasurbek Latipov	2
3	(Thailand) Chatchai Butdee	0
2	(Russia) Misha Aloyan	3

Final
(Uzbekistan) Jasurbek Latipov	1
(Russia) Misha Aloyan	2

=== Top half ===
==== Section 1 ====
First Round
(Angola) Vivaldo Rodrigues
(United States) Malik Jackson	TKO
(India) Lal Madan	0
(Moldova) Alexandros Rîşcan	3
(Australia) Andrew Moloney	3
(Sri Lanka) Dilanka Pattiarachchi	0

Second Round
(Wales) Andrew Selby	3
(United States) Malik Jackson	0
(Japan) Sadayori Aoki	0
(Cuba) Gerardo Tejeria	3
(Kyrgyzstan) Azat Usenaliev	3
(Moldova) Alexandros Rîşcan	0
(Australia) Andrew Moloney	0
(Kazakhstan) Ilyas Suleimenov	3

Third Round
(Wales) Andrew Selby	3
(Cuba) Gerardo Tejeria	0
(Kyrgyzstan) Azat Usenaliev	1
(Kazakhstan) Ilyas Suleimenov	2

Quarterfinals
(Wales) Andrew Selby	2
(Kazakhstan) Ilyas Suleimenov	1

==== Section 2 ====
First Round
(Serbia) Miloš Baltić	2
(China) Mai Qingxian	1
(Nigeria) Olayinka Yusuff	0
(England) Charlie Edwards	3
(Chinese Taipei) Chiu Po-wei	0
(North Macedonia) Mumin Veli	3
(Germany) Hamza Touba	2
(Brazil) Juliao Neto	1

Second Round
(Republic of Ireland) Paddy Barnes	3
(Serbia) Miloš Baltić	0
(England) Charlie Edwards
(Kenya) Simon Nzioki	TKO
(Armenia) Narek Abgaryan	3
(North Macedonia) Mumin Veli	0
(Germany) Hamza Touba	0
(Uzbekistan) Jasurbek Latipov	3

Third Round
(Republic of Ireland) Paddy Barnes	TKO
(Kenya) Simon Nzioki
(Armenia) Narek Abgaryan
(Uzbekistan) Jasurbek Latipov

Quarterfinals
(Republic of Ireland) Paddy Barnes	0
(Uzbekistan) Jasurbek Latipov	3

=== Bottom half ===
==== Section 3 ====
First Round
(Belarus) Siarhei Loban	0
(Thailand) Chatchai Butdee	3
(Guatemala) Eddie Barillas	0
(Philippines) Roldan Boncales	3
(Turkmenistan) Zarip Jumayev	3
(Pakistan) Muhammad Waseem	0
(Venezuela) Eduard Salas	3
(Nicaragua) Ricardo Blandon	0

Second Round
(Mexico) Elías Emigdio	0
(Thailand) Chatchai Butdee	3
(Philippines) Roldan Boncales	0
(North Korea) Ri Chung	3
(Afghanistan) Mohammad Nazari	0
(Turkmenistan) Zarip Jumayev	3
(Venezuela) Eduard Salas	1
(Azerbaijan) Elvin Mamishzade	2

Third Round
(Thailand) Chatchai Butdee	2
(North Korea) Ri Chung	1
(Turkmenistan) Zarip Jumayev	0
(Azerbaijan) Elvin Mamishzade	3

Quarterfinals
(Thailand) Chatchai Butdee	3
(Azerbaijan) Elvin Mamishzade	0

==== Section 4 ====
First Round
(Ukraine) Oleksandr Shepeliuk	0
(Tajikistan) Shahriyor Akhmedov	3
(Puerto Rico) Jantony Ortíz	3
(Georgia (country)) Severian Chiladze	0
(Hungary) Norbert Kalucza	3
(Central African Republic) Justin Grassa	0
(France) Elie Konki	0
(Bulgaria) Aleksandar Aleksandrov	3

Second Round
(Italy) Vincenzo Picardi	1
(Tajikistan) Shahriyor Akhmedov	2
(Puerto Rico) Jantony Ortíz	3
(Dominican Republic) Geraldo Pérez	0
(Botswana) Oteng Oteng	3
(Hungary) Norbert Kalucza	0
(Bulgaria) Aleksandar Aleksandrov	0
(Russia) Misha Aloyan	3

Third Round
(Tajikistan) Shahriyor Akhmedov	2
(Puerto Rico) Jantony Ortíz	1
(Botswana) Oteng Oteng	0
(Russia) Misha Aloyan	3

Quarterfinals
(Tajikistan) Shahriyor Akhmedov	0
(Russia) Misha Aloyan	3
