= 2015 AIBA World Boxing Championships – Flyweight =

Boxing competitions

The Flyweight competition at the 2015 AIBA World Boxing Championships was held from 7–15 October 2015. It was a qualifying tournament for the next year's 2016 Summer Olympics. Elvin Mamishzada of Azerbaijan defeated Yosbany Veitia of Cuba to win the world title.

== Medalists ==
| Gold | Elvin Mamishzada (AZE) |
| Silver | Yosbany Veitia (CUB) |
| Bronze | Hu Jianguan (CHN) |
| Bronze | Mohamed Flissi (ALG) |

== Seeds ==
1. (Cuba) Yosbany Veitia
2. (Azerbaijan) Elvin Mamishzada
3. (Algeria) Mohamed Flissi
4. (Bulgaria) Daniel Asenov

== Draw ==
=== Finals ===
Semifinals
1 | Yosbany Veitia (CUB) | 3
4 | Hu Jianguan (CHN) | 0
3 | Mohamed Flissi (ALG)
2 | Elvin Mamishzada (AZE) | TKO

Final
Yosbany Veitia (CUB) | 0
Elvin Mamishzada (AZE) | 3

==== Section 1 ====
Round of 32
Tanes Ongjunta (THA) | 0
Achraf Kharroubi (MAR) | 3
Zarip Jumayev (TKM) | 0
Yoel Finol Rivas (VEN) | 3
Fernando Martínez (ARG) | 0
Hu Jianguan (CHN) | 3
Olzhas Sattibayev (KAZ) | 2
Ihor Sopinskyi (UKR) | 1

Round of 16
Yosbany Veitia (CUB) | 2
Achraf Kharroubi (MAR) | 1
Yoel Finol Rivas (VEN) | 0
Ceiber Avila Segura (COL) | 3
Shakhobidin Zoirov (UZB) | 0
Hu Jianguan (CHN) | 3
Olzhas Sattibayev (KAZ) | 3
Daniel Asenov (BUL) | 0

Quarterfinals
Yosbany Veitia (CUB) | 3
Ceiber Avila Segura (COL) | 0
Hu Jianguan (CHN) | 3
Olzhas Sattibayev (KAZ) | 0

Semifinals
Yosbany Veitia (CUB) | 3
Hu Jianguan (CHN) | 0

==== Section 2 ====
Round of 32
Koryun Soghomonyan (ARM) | 3
Charles Keama (PNG) | 0
David Jimenez (CRC) | 2
Nandor Csoka (HUN) | 1
Vincenzo Picardi (ITA) | KO
Madan Lal (IND)
Azat Usenaliev (KGZ) | 0
Hamza Touba (GER) | 3

Round of 16
Mohamed Flissi (ALG) | 3
Koryun Soghomonyan (ARM) | 0
David Jimenez (CRC) | 2
José Kelvin de la Nieve (ESP) | 1
Muhammad Ali (GBR) | 2
Vincenzo Picardi (ITA) | 1
Hamza Touba (GER) | 0
Elvin Mamishzada (AZE) | 3

Quarterfinals
Mohamed Flissi (ALG) | 3
David Jimenez (CRC) | 0
Muhammad Ali (GBR)
Elvin Mamishzada (AZE) | TKO

Semifinals
Mohamed Flissi (ALG)
Elvin Mamishzada (AZE) | TKO

== Results ==
=== Ranking ===
| Rank | Athlete |
|---|---|
| 1st place, gold medalist(s) | Elvin Mamishzada (AZE) |
| 2nd place, silver medalist(s) | Yosbany Veitia (CUB) |
| 3rd place, bronze medalist(s) | Hu Jianguan (CHN) |
| 3rd place, bronze medalist(s) | Mohamed Flissi (ALG) |
| 5 | Ceiber Avila Segura (COL) |
| 5 | Olzhas Sattibayev (KAZ) |
| 5 | David Jimenez (CRC) |
| 5 | Muhammad Ali (GBR) |
| 9 | Achraf Kharroubi (MAR) |
| 9 | Yoel Finol Rivas (VEN) |
| 9 | Shakhobidin Zoirov (UZB) |
| 9 | Daniel Asenov (BUL) |
| 9 | Koryun Soghomonyan (ARM) |
| 9 | José Kelvin de la Nieve (ESP) |
| 9 | Hamza Touba (GER) |
| 9 | Vincenzo Picardi (ITA) |
| 17 | Tanes Ongjunta (THA) |
| 17 | Zarip Jumayev (TKM) |
| 17 | Fernando Martínez (ARG) |
| 17 | Ihor Sopinskyi (UKR) |
| 17 | Charles Keama (PNG) |
| 17 | Nandor Csoka (HUN) |
| 17 | Madan Lal (IND) |
| 17 | Azat Usenaliev (KGZ) |
