= Boxing at the 2015 European Games – Men's 52 kg =

Boxing competitions

Men's flyweight boxing at the 2015 European Games
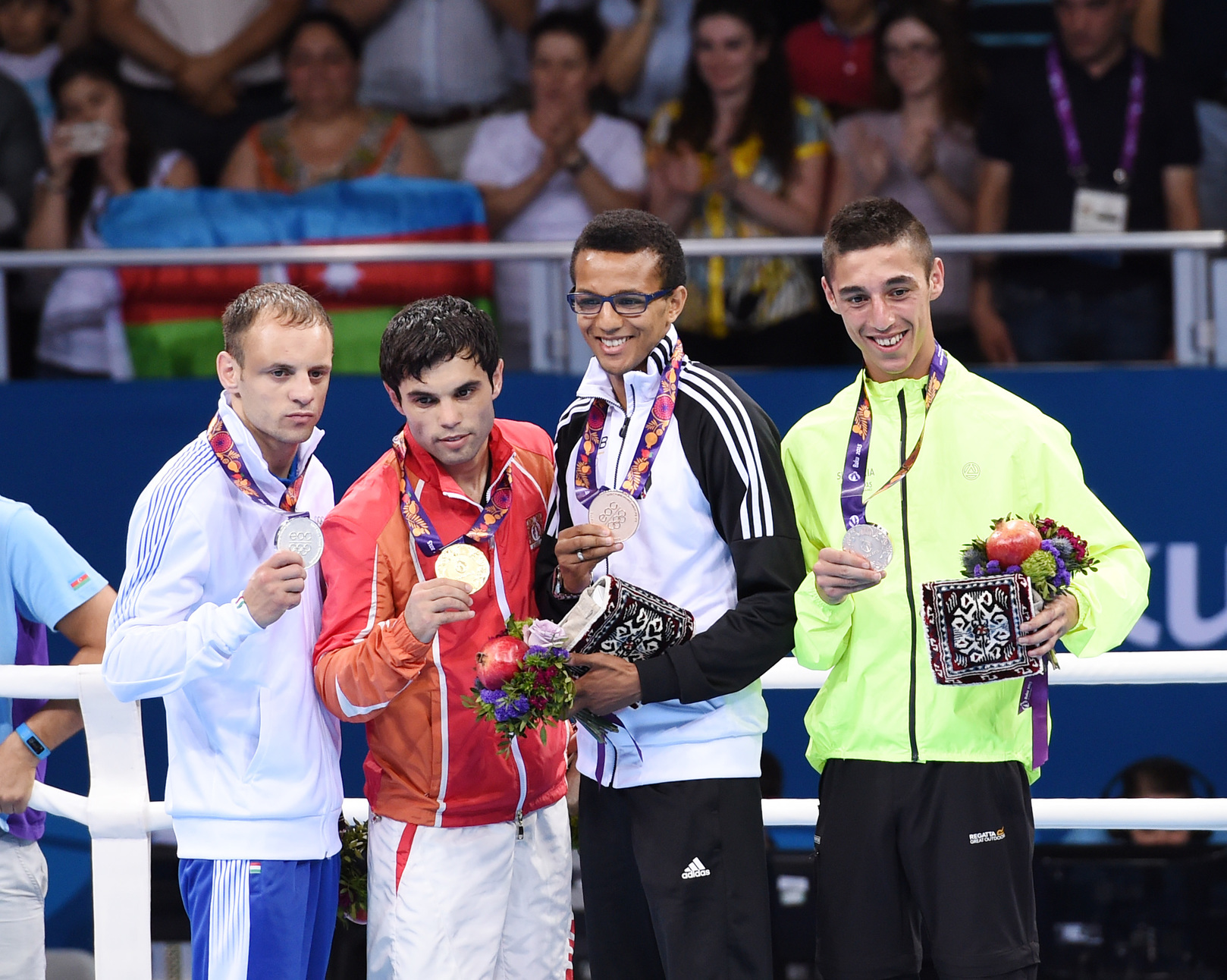
- The medal ceremony
- Venue: Baku Crystal Hall
- Date: 16–26 June
- Competitors: 19 from 19 nations

Medalists
gold medal	Elvin Mamishzada	Azerbaijan
silver medal	Vincenzo Picardi	Italy
bronze medal	Hamza Touba	Germany
bronze medal	Viliam Tankó	Slovakia

The men's 52 kg boxing event at the 2015 European Games in Baku took place between 16 and 26 June at the Baku Crystal Hall.

== Results ==
Round of 32
Myles Casey (IRL)	3
Ivan Fihurenka (BLR)	0
Nándor Csóka (HUN)	3
Maciej Jóźwik (POL)	0
Muhammad Ali (GBR)	3
Alexandr Riscan (MDA)	0

Round of 16
Elvin Mamishzada (AZE)	3
Myles Casey (IRL)	0
Daniel Asenov (BUL)	3
José Kelvin de la Nieve (ESP)	0
Hamza Touba (GER)	3
Ihor Sopinskiy (UKR)	0
Severiane Chiladze (GEO)	0
Vasilii Vetkin (RUS)	3
Narek Abgaryan (ARM)	2
Nándor Csóka (HUN)	1
Dodji Kodjo Ayigah (BEL)	0
Viliam Tankó (SVK)	3
Ferhat Pehlivan (TUR)	3
Elie Konki (FRA)	0
Muhammad Ali (GBR)	1
Vincenzo Picardi (ITA)	2

Quarterfinals
Elvin Mamishzada (AZE)	2
Daniel Asenov (BUL)	1
Hamza Touba (GER)	2
Vasilii Vetkin (RUS)	1
Narek Abgaryan (ARM)	1
Viliam Tankó (SVK)	2
Ferhat Pehlivan (TUR)	1
Vincenzo Picardi (ITA)	2

Semifinals
Elvin Mamishzada (AZE)	3
Hamza Touba (GER)	0
Viliam Tankó (SVK)	0
Vincenzo Picardi (ITA)	3

Final
Elvin Mamishzada (AZE)	3
Vincenzo Picardi (ITA)	0
