= 2019 AIBA World Boxing Championships – Flyweight =

Flyweight at the 2019 AIBA World Boxing Championships
- Venue: Ekaterinburg Expo
- Location: Yekaterinburg, Russia
- Dates: 12–21 September
- Competitors: 41 from 41 nations

Medalists
gold medal	Shakhobidin Zoirov	Uzbekistan
silver medal	Amit Panghal	India
bronze medal	Billal Bennama	France
bronze medal	Saken Bibossinov	Kazakhstan

The Flyweight competition at the 2019 AIBA World Boxing Championships was held from 12 to 21 September 2019.

== Schedule ==
The schedule was as follows:

Date	Time	Round
Thursday 12 September 2019	15:00	First round
Saturday 14 September 2019	15:00	Second round
Tuesday 17 September 2019	15:00	Third round
Wednesday 18 September 2019	15:00	Quarterfinals
Friday 20 September 2019	15:00	Semifinals
Saturday 21 September 2019	19:00	Final

All times are Yekaterinburg Time (UTC+5)

== Results ==
=== Finals ===
Semi-finals
(France) Billal Bennama	0
(Uzbekistan) Shakhobidin Zoirov	5
(Kazakhstan) Saken Bibossinov	2
(India) Amit Panghal	3

Final
(Uzbekistan) Shakhobidin Zoirov	5
(India) Amit Panghal	0

=== Top half ===
==== Section 1 ====
First round
(Algeria) Mohamed Flissi	5
(Democratic Republic of the Congo) Doudou Ilunga	0
(Afghanistan) Ramish Rahmani	0
(China) Hu Jianguan	5
(Japan) Tosho Kashiwasaki	2
(Ecuador) Luis Delgado	3

Second round
(Cuba) Yosvany Veitía	3
(Algeria) Mohamed Flissi	2
(Australia) Alex Winwood	0
(England) Galal Yafai	5
(France) Billal Bennama	3
(China) Hu Jianguan	2
(Ecuador) Luis Delgado	0
(Russia) Vasilii Egorov	5

Third round
(Cuba) Yosvany Veitía	0
(England) Galal Yafai	5
(France) Billal Bennama	5
(Russia) Vasilii Egorov	0

Quarterfinals
(England) Galal Yafai	0
(France) Billal Bennama	5

==== Section 2 ====
First round
(Republic of Ireland) Regan Buckley	2
(Indonesia) Aldoms Suguro	3
(Uzbekistan) Shakhobidin Zoirov	5
(Turkmenistan) Yhlas Gylyçjanow	0

Second round
(Bulgaria) Daniel Asenov	5
(Indonesia) Aldoms Suguro	0
(United States) Michael Angeletti	3
(Italy) Federico Serra	2
(Kyrgyzstan) Azat Usenaliev	5
(Romania) Marian Șchiopu	0
(Uzbekistan) Shakhobidin Zoirov	5
(Dominican Republic) Rodrigo Marte	0

Third round
(Bulgaria) Daniel Asenov	5
(United States) Michael Angeletti	0
(Kyrgyzstan) Azat Usenaliev	0
(Uzbekistan) Shakhobidin Zoirov	5

Quarterfinals
(Bulgaria) Daniel Asenov	0
(Uzbekistan) Shakhobidin Zoirov	5

=== Bottom half ===
==== Section 3 ====
First round
(Thailand) Wuttichai Yurachai	0
(Argentina) Ramón Quiroga	5
(Serbia) Dušan Janjić	2
(Jordan) Mohammad Al-Gharaghir	3

Second round
(Colombia) Yuberjen Martínez	3
(Argentina) Ramón Quiroga	2
(Kazakhstan) Saken Bibossinov	3
(Mongolia) Kharkhüügiin Enkhmandakh	2
(Azerbaijan) Masud Yusifzada	5
(Morocco) Said Mortaji	0
(Jordan) Mohammad Al-Gharaghir	0
(Armenia) Artur Hovhannisyan	5

Third round
(Colombia) Yuberjen Martínez	0
(Kazakhstan) Saken Bibossinov	5
(Azerbaijan) Masud Yusifzada	0
(Armenia) Artur Hovhannisyan	5

Quarterfinals
(Kazakhstan) Saken Bibossinov	4
(Armenia) Artur Hovhannisyan	1

==== Section 4 ====
First round
(South Korea) Jo Se-hyeong	5
(Georgia (country)) Nodari Darbaidze	0
(Israel) David Alaverdian	2
(Chinese Taipei) Tu Po-wei	3

Second round
(Germany) Salah Ibrahim	2
(South Korea) Jo Se-hyeong	3
(Philippines) Carlo Paalam	5
(Hungary) István Szaka	0
(Ukraine) Maksym Fatych	0
(Turkey) Batuhan Çiftçi	5
(Chinese Taipei) Tu Po-wei	0
(India) Amit Panghal	5

Third round
(South Korea) Jo Se-hyeong	0
(Philippines) Carlo Paalam	5
(Turkey) Batuhan Çiftçi	0
(India) Amit Panghal	5

Quarterfinals
(Philippines) Carlo Paalam	1
(India) Amit Panghal	4
