= 2011 World Amateur Boxing Championships – Flyweight =

Boxing competitions

The Flyweight competition was the second-lightest class featured at the 2011 World Amateur Boxing Championships, held at the Heydar Aliyev Sports and Exhibition Complex. Boxers were limited to a maximum of 52 kilograms (115 lb) in body mass.

== Medalists ==
Gold	Misha Aloyan (RUS)
Silver	Andrew Selby (WAL)
Bronze	Rau'shee Warren (USA)
Bronze	Jasurbek Latipov (UZB)

== Seeds ==
1. (Russia) Misha Aloyan (champion)
2. (France) Nordine Oubaali (third round)
3. (Germany) Ronny Beblik (second round)
4. (United States) Rau'shee Warren (semifinals)
5. (England) Khalid Yafai (quarterfinals)
6. (Italy) Vincenzo Picardi (quarterfinals)
7. (Argentina) Fernando Martínez (second round)
8. (Azerbaijan) Elvin Mamishzade (quarterfinals)
9. (Mongolia) Tugstsogt Nyambayar (third round)
10. (Wales) Andrew Selby (runner-up)
11. (China) Chang Yong (first round)
12. (Mauritius) Gilbert Bactora (first round)

== Draw ==
=== Finals ===
Semifinals
1	Misha Aloyan (RUS)	17
4	Rau'shee Warren (USA)	13
3	Jasurbek Latipov (UZB)	15
2	Andrew Selby (WAL)	21

Final
Misha Aloyan (RUS)	13
Andrew Selby (WAL)	12

=== Top half ===
==== Section 1 ====
First round
Selçuk Eker (TUR)	15
Oteng Oteng (BOT)	17
Mumin Veli (MKD)
Robeisy Ramírez (CUB)	RET
Sudesh Manandhar (NEP)	WO
Lamda Long (CAM)
Tugstsogt Nyambayar (MGL)	22
Stefan Ivanov (BUL)	15
Zsolt Dobradi (HUN)	8
Suranjoy Singh (IND)	24
Francisco Torrijos (ESP)	15
Ludumo Lamati (RSA)	5
Julio Bria (INA)	8
Elvin Mamishzade (AZE)	19

Second round
Misha Aloyan (RUS)	18
Oteng Oteng (BOT)	5
Robeisy Ramírez (CUB)	RSC
Sudesh Manandhar (NEP)
Tugstsogt Nyambayar (MGL)	17
Suranjoy Singh (IND)	14
Francisco Torrijos (ESP)	15
Elvin Mamishzade (AZE)	21

Third round
Misha Aloyan (RUS)	15
Robeisy Ramírez (CUB)	11
Tugstsogt Nyambayar (MGL)	14
Elvin Mamishzade (AZE)	17

Quarterfinals
Misha Aloyan (RUS)	14
Elvin Mamishzade (AZE)	12

==== Section 2 ====
First round
Akueteh Micah (GHA)	10
Katsuaki Susa (JPN)	23
Azat Usenaliev (KGZ)	15
Elías Emigdio (MEX)	16
Muhammad Waseem (PAK)	RSC
Gilbert Bactora (MRI)
Safoviddin Yusufi (TJK)	12
Van Hai Nguyen (VIE)	9
Rey Saludar (PHI)	21
Kenny Lally (CAN)	20
Andrew Moloney (AUS)	10
Georgiy Chygayev (UKR)	19

Second round
Khalid Yafai (ENG)	28
Katsuaki Susa (JPN)	16
Elías Emigdio (MEX)	18
Muhammad Waseem (PAK)	14
Safoviddin Yusufi (TJK)	12
Rey Saludar (PHI)	28
Georgiy Chygayev (UKR)	15
Rau'shee Warren (USA)	22

Third round
Khalid Yafai (ENG)	27
Elías Emigdio (MEX)	15
Rey Saludar (PHI)	12
Rau'shee Warren (USA)	22

Quarterfinals
Khalid Yafai (ENG)	9
Rau'shee Warren (USA)	14

=== Bottom half ===
==== Section 3 ====
First round
Piotr Gudel (POL)	7
Salomo N'tuve (SWE)	23
Ivan Finurenka (BLR)	23
Rene Rajko (SVK)	11
Jasurbek Latipov (UZB)	17
Samir Brahimi (ALG)	4
Chang Yong (CHN)	7
Dagoberto Aguero (DOM)	18
Felipe de la Flor (PAN)	6
Oscar Negrete (COL)	15
Mohammad Al-Wadi (JOR)	RSC
Maung Nge (MYA)
Lin Yu-che (TPE)	8
Vincenzo Picardi (ITA)	21

Second round
Ronny Beblik (GER)	8
Salomo N'tuve (SWE)	12
Ivan Finurenka (BLR)	7
Jasurbek Latipov (UZB)	21
Dagoberto Aguero (DOM)	19
Oscar Negrete (COL)	12
Mohammad Al-Wadi (JOR)	12
Vincenzo Picardi (ITA)	18

Third round
Salomo N'tuve (SWE)	7
Jasurbek Latipov (UZB)	10
Dagoberto Aguero (DOM)	12
Vincenzo Picardi (ITA)	18

Quarterfinals
Jasurbek Latipov (UZB)	18
Vincenzo Picardi (ITA)	11

==== Section 4 ====
First round
Fernando Martínez (ARG)	19
Ajmal Faisal (AFG)	9
José Meza (ECU)	9
Chatchai Butdee (THA)	18
Iman Tayyebi (IRI)	10
Severiane Chiladze (GEO)	14
Hesham Abdelaal (EGY)	16
Andrew Selby (WAL)	28
Abdelfattah Nafil (MAR)	7
Olzhas Sattibayev (KAZ)	14
Michael Conlan (IRL)	25
Alexandr Riscan (MDA)	12
Hong Moo-Won (KOR)	16
Zarip Jumayev (TKM)	+16

Second round
Fernando Martínez (ARG)	9
Chatchai Butdee (THA)	19
Severiane Chiladze (GEO)	7
Andrew Selby (WAL)	26
Olzhas Sattibayev (KAZ)	17
Michael Conlan (IRL)	18
Zarip Jumayev (TKM)	11
Nordine Oubaali (FRA)	24

Third round
Chatchai Butdee (THA)	12
Andrew Selby (WAL)	25
Michael Conlan (IRL)	20
Nordine Oubaali (FRA)	17

Quarterfinals
Andrew Selby (WAL)	25
Michael Conlan (IRL)	24
