= Boxing at the 2016 Summer Olympics – Men's flyweight =

Men's flyweight boxing at the Games of the XXXI Olympiad
- Venue: Riocentro – Pavilion 6
- Date: 13–21 August 2016
- Competitors: 26 from 26 nations

Medalists
1st place, gold medalist(s)		Shakhobidin Zoirov	Uzbekistan
2nd place, silver medalist(s)		Yoel Finol	Venezuela
3rd place, bronze medalist(s)		Hu Jianguan	China

The men's flyweight boxing competition at the Rio 2016 Summer Olympics was held from 13 to 21 August at the Riocentro.

The medals for the competition were presented by Irena Szewinska, Poland, IOC member, and the gifts were presented by Wu Ching-kuo, President of the AIBA.

== Competition format ==
Like all Olympic boxing events, the competition was a straight single-elimination tournament. This event consisted of 26 boxers who had qualified for the competition through various qualifying tournaments held in 2015 and 2016. The competition began with a preliminary round on 13 August, where the number of competitors was reduced to 16, and concluded with the final on 21 August. As there were fewer than 32 boxers in the competition, a number of boxers received a bye through the preliminary round. Both semi-final losers were awarded bronze medals.

== Schedule ==
All times are Brasília Time (UTC−3).

Date	Time	Round
Saturday, 13 August 2016	11:00 & 17:00	Round of 32
Monday, 15 August 2016	11:30 & 17:30	Round of 16
Wednesday, 17 August 2016	15:30	Quarterfinals
Friday, 19 August 2016	14:00	Semifinals
Sunday, 21 August 2016	14:15	Final

== Results ==
=== Finals ===
Semi-finals
Shakhobidin Zoirov (UZB)	3
Yoel Finol (VEN)	0
Misha Aloyan (RUS)	3
Hu Jianguan (CHN)	0

Final
Shakhobidin Zoirov (UZB)	3
Misha Aloyan (RUS)	0 DSQ

The original silver medalist, Misha Aloyan of Russia, was disqualified after testing positive for tuaminoheptane. Medals was reallocated with second bronze not awarded.

=== Top half ===
Round of 32
Jeyvier Cintrón (PUR)	1
Olzhas Sattibayev (KAZ)	2
Shakhobidin Zoirov (UZB)	3
Brendan Irvine (IRL)	0
Julião Henriques Neto (BRA)	1
Antonio Vargas (USA)	2
Yoel Finol (VEN)	3
Leonel de los Santos (DOM)	0
Fernando Martínez (ARG)	1
Daniel Asenov (BUL)	2

Round of 16
Elvin Mamishzada (AZE)	3
Olzhas Sattibayev (KAZ)	0
Shakhobidin Zoirov (UZB)	3
Antonio Vargas (USA)	0
Muhammad Ali (GBR)	0
Yoel Finol (VEN)	3
Daniel Asenov (BUL)	0
Mohamed Flissi (ALG)	3

Quarter-finals
Elvin Mamishzada (AZE)	0
Shakhobidin Zoirov (UZB)	3
Yoel Finol (VEN)	3
Mohamed Flissi (ALG)	0

Semi-finals
Shakhobidin Zoirov (UZB)	3
Yoel Finol (VEN)	0

=== Bottom half ===
Round of 32
Elie Konki (FRA)	3
Hamza Touba (GER)	0
Elías Emigdio (MEX)	3
Kharkhüügiin Enkh-Amar (MGL)	0
Hu Jianguan (CHN)	2
Selçuk Eker (TUR)	1
Ronald Serugo (UGA)	1
Narek Abgaryan (ARM)	2
Achraf Kharroubi (MAR)	3
Moroke Mokhotho (LES)	0

Round of 16
Misha Aloyan (RUS)	3
Elie Konki (FRA)	0
Elías Emigdio (MEX)	0
Ceiber Ávila (COL)	3
Hu Jianguan (CHN)	3
Narek Abgaryan (ARM)	0
Achraf Kharroubi (MAR)	0
Yosvany Veitía (CUB)	3

Quarter-finals
Misha Aloyan (RUS)	3
Ceiber Ávila (COL)	0
Hu Jianguan (CHN)	2
Yosvany Veitía (CUB)	1

Semi-finals
Misha Aloyan (RUS)	3
Hu Jianguan (CHN)	0
