= 2021 AIBA World Boxing Championships – Bantamweight =

Boxing competition

Bantamweight at the 2021 AIBA World Boxing Championships
- Venue: Štark Arena
- Location: Belgrade, Serbia
- Dates: 29 October – 5 November
- Competitors: 30 from 30 nations

Medalists
gold medal	Tomoya Tsuboi	Japan
silver medal	Makhmud Sabyrkhan	Kazakhstan
bronze medal	Akash Kumar	India
bronze medal	Billal Bennama	France

The Bantamweight competition at the 2021 AIBA World Boxing Championships was held from 29 October to 5 November 2021.

== Results ==
=== Finals ===
Semifinals
(India) Akash Kumar	0
(Kazakhstan) Makhmud Sabyrkhan	5
(Japan) Tomoya Tsuboi	4
(France) Billal Bennama	1

Final
(Kazakhstan) Makhmud Sabyrkhan	0
(Japan) Tomoya Tsuboi	5

=== Top half ===
==== Section 1 ====
First round
(Germany) Salah Ibrahim Omar
(India) Akash Kumar	w/o
(Ukraine) Yelmir Nabiiev	2
(Venezuela) Yoel Finol	3
(Bulgaria) Daniel Asenov	0
(Spain) Gabriel Escobar	5

Second round
(Puerto Rico) Caleb Tirado	0
(India) Akash Kumar	5
(Venezuela) Yoel Finol	3
(Spain) Gabriel Escobar	2

Quarterfinals
(India) Akash Kumar	5
(Venezuela) Yoel Finol	0

==== Section 2 ====
First round
(Brazil) Michael Trindade	RSC
(Nicaragua) Nelson Guerrero
(Kenya) Shaffi Hassan
(Turkey) Muhammet Saçlı	RSC
(Scotland) Matthew McHale	5
Kurban Bairanbekov	0
(South Korea) Kim In-kyu	0
(Kazakhstan) Makhmud Sabyrkhan	5

Second round
(Brazil) Michael Trindade	5
(Turkey) Muhammet Saçlı	0
(Scotland) Matthew McHale	1
(Kazakhstan) Makhmud Sabyrkhan	4

Quarterfinals
(Brazil) Michael Trindade	0
(Kazakhstan) Makhmud Sabyrkhan	5

=== Bottom half ===
==== Section 3 ====
First round
(Japan) Tomoya Tsuboi	5
(Italy) Manuel Cappai	0
(Uzbekistan) Shakhobidin Zoirov	5
(Serbia) Tamir Galanov	0
(Hungary) Nándor Csóka	1
(Barbados) Jabali Breedy	4
Patiphan Uthaida	0
(Mongolia) Enkh-Amgalangiin Bayarsaikhan	5

Second round
(Japan) Tomoya Tsuboi	3
(Uzbekistan) Shakhobidin Zoirov	2
(Barbados) Jabali Breedy	4
(Mongolia) Enkh-Amgalangiin Bayarsaikhan	1

Quarterfinals
(Japan) Tomoya Tsuboi	5
(Barbados) Jabali Breedy	0

==== Section 4 ====
First round
(Chinese Taipei) Li Yu-hung	0
(Armenia) Vahe Badalyan	5
(Kyrgyzstan) Sanzhai Seidekmatov	4
(Ecuador) Manuel Chusin	1
(France) Billal Bennama	3
(Colombia) Juan Sebastián Palacios	2

Second round
(Armenia) Vahe Badalyan	0
(Kyrgyzstan) Sanzhai Seidekmatov	5
(France) Billal Bennama	5
(Democratic Republic of the Congo) Jerry Katamba Kabango	0

Quarterfinals
(Kyrgyzstan) Sanzhai Seidekmatov	0
(France) Billal Bennama	5
