= 2023 IBA World Boxing Championships – Flyweight =

Flyweight at the 2023 IBA World Boxing Championships
- Venue: Humo Arena
- Location: Tashkent, Uzbekistan
- Dates: 4–14 May
- Competitors: 43 from 43 nations

Medalists
gold medal	Hasanboy Dusmatov	Uzbekistan
silver medal	Billal Bennama	France
bronze medal	Deepak Bhoria	India
bronze medal	Martín Molina	Spain

The Flyweight competition at the 2023 IBA Men's World Boxing Championships was held between 4 and 14 May 2023.

== Results ==
=== Finals ===
Semifinals
(India) Deepak Bhoria	3
(France) Billal Bennama	4
(Uzbekistan) Hasanboy Dusmatov	5
(Spain) Martín Molina	0

Final
(France) Billal Bennama
(Uzbekistan) Hasanboy Dusmatov	KO

=== Top half ===
==== Section 1 ====
Round of 64
(Ecuador) Luis Delgado	0
(India) Deepak Bhoria	5
(Kyrgyzstan) Nurzhigit Diushebaev	4
(South Africa) Sinovuyo Mtintelwa	1
(Hungary) Attila Bernáth	0
(Bulgaria) Daniel Asenov	5

Round of 32
(Kazakhstan) Saken Bibossinov	2
(India) Deepak Bhoria	5
(China) Zhang Jiamao	5
(Tajikistan) Mehrob Hamidov	0
(Lesotho) Retselisitsoe Kolobe	0
(Kyrgyzstan) Nurzhigit Diushebaev	5
(Bulgaria) Daniel Asenov	1
(Algeria) Mohammed Moziane	4

Round of 16
(India) Deepak Bhoria	5
(China) Zhang Jiamao	0
(Kyrgyzstan) Nurzhigit Diushebaev	5
(Algeria) Mohammed Moziane	0

Quarterfinals
(India) Deepak Bhoria	5
(Kyrgyzstan) Nurzhigit Diushebaev	0

==== Section 2 ====
Round of 64
(Armenia) Rudolf Garboyan	1
(Chinese Taipei) Tu Po-wei	4
(Jordan) Huthaifa Eshish	4
(Sri Lanka) Pasindu Godakandalage	1

Round of 32
(Colombia) Yuberjen Martínez	2
(Chinese Taipei) Tu Po-wei	5
(Burkina Faso) Moussa Nimubona	2
(Ethiopia) Dawit Bekele Wibshet	5
(Hong Kong) Kanneth Tam
(Thailand) Thitisan Panmod	RSC
(Jordan) Huthaifa Eshish	0
(France) Billal Bennama	5

Round of 16
(Chinese Taipei) Tu Po-wei	5
(Ethiopia) Dawit Bekele Wibshet	0
(Thailand) Thitisan Panmod	1
(France) Billal Bennama	4

Quarterfinals
(Chinese Taipei) Tu Po-wei	0
(France) Billal Bennama	5

=== Bottom half ===
==== Section 3 ====
Round of 64
(Turkey) Samet Gümüş	1
(Russia) Vasilii Egorov	4
(Bahrain) Azat Makhmetov	5
(Italy) Alessio Camiolo	2
(Mexico) Óscar Castañeda	0
(Uzbekistan) Hasanboy Dusmatov	5

Round of 32
(Japan) Tomoya Tsuboi	4
(Russia) Vasilii Egorov	1
(Botswana) Rajab Mahommed	0
(Kenya) David Karanja	5
(Cuba) Erislan Romero	4
(Bahrain) Azat Makhmetov	1
(Uzbekistan) Hasanboy Dusmatov	5
(Morocco) Said Mortaji	0

Round of 16
(Japan) Tomoya Tsuboi	5
(Kenya) David Karanja	0
(Cuba) Erislan Romero	0
(Uzbekistan) Hasanboy Dusmatov	5

Quarterfinals
(Japan) Tomoya Tsuboi	3
(Uzbekistan) Hasanboy Dusmatov	4

==== Section 4 ====
Round of 64
(Brazil) Michael Trindade	5
(South Korea) Jo Se-hyeong	0
(Zambia) Patrick Chinyemba	4
(Serbia) Omer Ametović	3
(Barbados) Jabali Breedy	4
(Cape Verde) Daniel Varela de Pina	3

Round of 32
(Azerbaijan) Masud Yusifzada	5
(Brazil) Michael Trindade	2
(Zambia) Patrick Chinyemba	4
(Ghana) Theophilus Allotey	1
(Mongolia) Kharkhüügiin Enkhmandakh	4
(Belarus) Dzianis Salotskikh	1
(Barbados) Jabali Breedy	3
(Spain) Martín Molina	4

Round of 16
(Azerbaijan) Masud Yusifzada	0
(Zambia) Patrick Chinyemba	5
(Mongolia) Kharkhüügiin Enkhmandakh	0
(Spain) Martín Molina	5

Quarterfinals
(Zambia) Patrick Chinyemba	3
(Spain) Martín Molina	4
