= Tomoya Tsuboi =

Japanese boxer (born 1996)

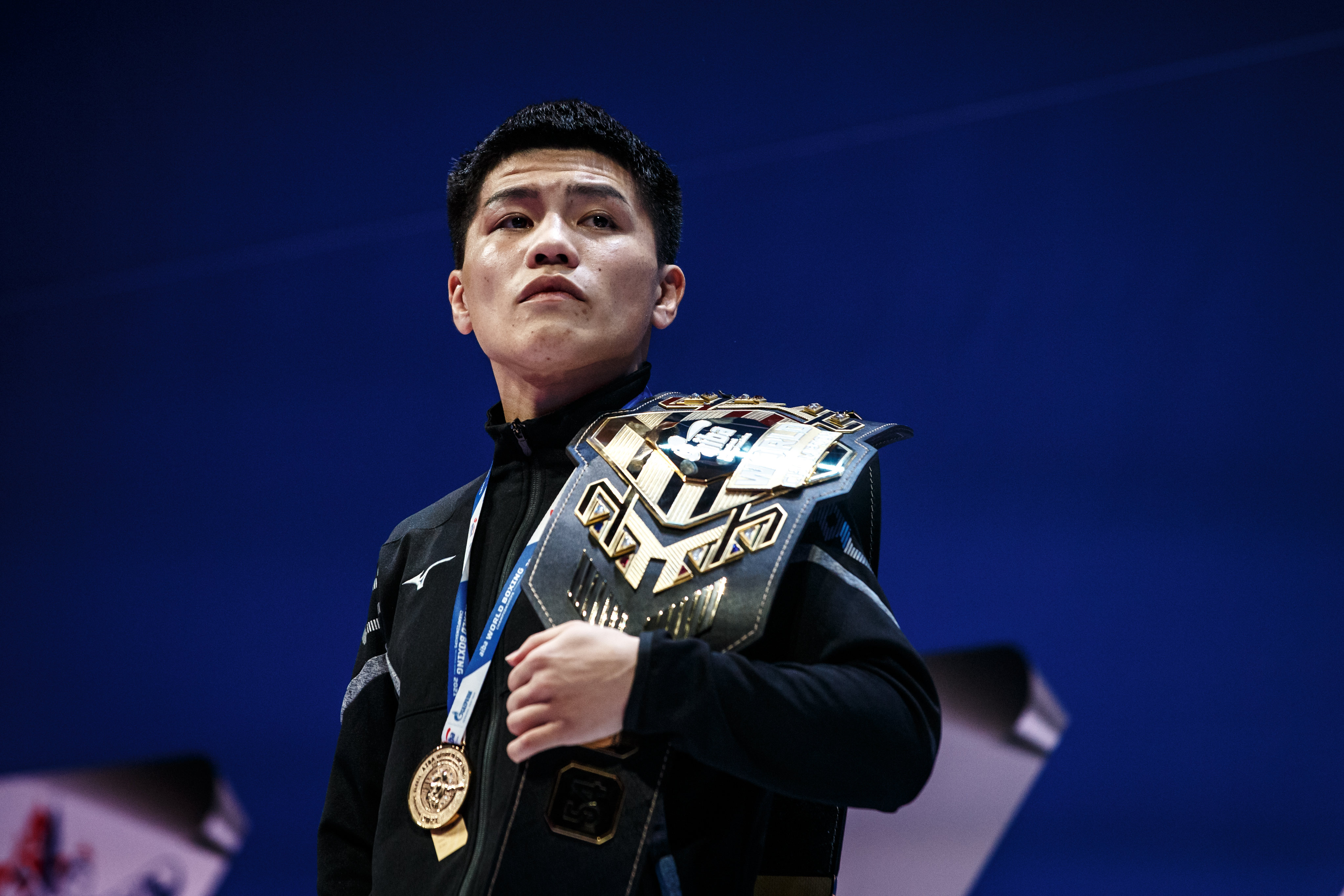
- Tsuboi at the 2021 World Championships

Personal information
- Born: 25 March 1996 (age 30) Hamamatsu, Shizuoka, Japan
- Height: 5 ft 3 in (160 cm)
- Weight: Bantamweight

Boxing career
- Stance: Orthodox

Boxing record
- Total fights: 5
- Wins: 3
- Win by KO: 2
- Losses: 1
- No contests: 1
Medal record
Men's amateur boxing
Representing Japan
IBA World Championships
Gold medal – first place	2021 Belgrade	Bantamweight
Asian Games
Bronze medal – third place	2022 Hangzhou	Flyweight
Asian Championships
Bronze medal – third place	2022 Amman	Flyweight

Tomoya Tsuboi (坪井智也, Tsuboi Tomoya; born 25 March 1996) is a Japanese professional boxer. As an amateur, Tsuboi won a gold medal at the 2021 AIBA World Boxing Championships. Tsuboi also won bronze medals at both the 2022 Asian Games and 2022 Asian Amateur Boxing Championships.

== Amateur career ==
=== World Championship results ===
Belgrade 2021

- First round: Defeated Manuel Cappai (Italy) 5–0
- Second round: Defeated Shakhobidin Zoirov (Uzbekistan) 3–2
- Quarter-finals: Defeated Jabali Breedy (Barbados) 5–0
- Semi-finals: Defeated Billal Bennama (France) 4–1
- Final: Defeated Makhmud Sabyrkhan (Kazakhstan) 5–0

Tashkent 2023

- Round of 32: Defeated Vasilii Egorov (Russia) 4–1
- Round of 16: Defeated David Karanja (Kenya) 5–0
- Quarter-finals: Defeated by Hasanboy Dusmatov (Uzbekistan) 4–3

=== Asian Games result ===
Hangzhou 2021

- Round of 16: Defeated Deepak Bhoria (India) 5–0
- Quarter-finals: Defeated Nurzhigit Diushebaev (Kyrgyzstan) 5–0
- Semi-finals: Defeated by Hasanboy Dusmatov (Uzbekistan) 4–1

=== Asian Championship result ===
Amman 2022

- Round of 16: Defeated Azat Makhmetov (Kazakhstan) 5–0
- Quarter-finals: Defeated Po Wei Tu (Taiwan) 5–0
- Semi-finals: Defeated by Saken Bibossinov (Kazakhstan) 5–0

== Professional career ==
On 13 March 2025, Tsuboi made his professional debut in a bout against Boonrueang Phayom. In the second round, Tsuboi scored a knockdown after landing a shot to the body of his opponent. Phayom was able to recover from the knockdown, but was dropped for a second time later in the round which resulted in the referee opting to call an end to the bout. On 8 June 2025, Tsuboi faced Trần Văn Thảo for the vacant WBO Asia Pacific bantamweight title. Tsuboi was able to secure the win after outboxing his opponent for the majority of the bout.

In just his fifth professional fight, Tsuboi faced Ricardo Malajika for the vacant WBC super-flyweight title at Toyota Arena in Tokyo on 27 September 2026. He lost via split decision with two of the ringside judges scoring the bout 116–112 and 115–113 respectively for his opponent, while the third had it 115–113 in his favour.

== Professional boxing record ==
5 fights	3 wins	1 loss
By knockout	2	0
By decision	1	1
No contests	1	

No.	Result	Record	Opponent	Type	Round, time	Date	Location	Notes
5	Loss	3–1 (1)	Ricardo Malajika	SD	12	Sep 27, 2026	Toyota Arena Tokyo, Tokyo, Japan	For vacant WBC super-flyweight title
4	NC	3–0 (1)	Pedro Guevara	NC	2 (10), 0:23	Apr 11, 2026	Korakuen Hall, Tokyo, Japan	
3	Win	3–0	Carlos Cuadras	TKO	8 (10), 2:59	24 Nov 2025	Toyota Arena, Tokyo, Japan	
2	Win	2–0	Trần Văn Thảo	UD	10	8 Jun 2025	Ariake Coliseum, Tokyo, Japan	Won vacant WBO Asia Pacific bantamweight title
1	Win	1–0	Boonrueang Phayom	TKO	2 (8), 2:34	13 Mar 2025	Korakuen Hall, Tokyo, Japan	

Sporting positions
Regional boxing titles
Vacant Title last held by Tenshin Nasukawa	WBO Asia Pacific bantamweight champion 8 June 2025 – present	Incumbent
