= Boxing at the 2019 European Games – Men's 52 kg =

Boxing competitions

Men's flyweight boxing at the 2019 European Games
- Venue: Uruchie Sports Palace
- Date: 23–29 June
- Competitors: 17 from 17 nations

Medalists
gold medal	Gabriel Escobar	Spain
silver medal	Daniel Asenov	Bulgaria
bronze medal	Manuel Cappai	Italy
bronze medal	Galal Yafai	Great Britain

The men's flyweight 52 kg boxing event at the 2019 European Games in Minsk was held from 23 to 29 June at the Uruchie Sports Palace.

== Results ==
Round of 32; 23 June
Hamza Touba (GER)	3
Batuhan Çiftçi (TUR)	2

Round of 16; 24 June
Daniel Asenov (BUL)	5
Hamza Touba (GER)	0
Billal Bennama (FRA)	5
Dušan Janjić (SRB)	0
Dmytro Zamotayev (UKR)	4
Masud Yusifzada (AZE)	1
Martin Virbán (HUN)	0
Galal Yafai (GBR)	5
Manuel Cappai (ITA)	5
Kirill Serikov (EST)	0
Marian Schiopu (ROU)	0
Nodari Darbaidze (GEO)	5
Emil Aliyeu (BLR)	1
Baregham Harutyunyan (ARM)	4
Vadim Kudriakov (RUS)	1
Gabriel Escobar (ESP)	4

Quarterfinals; 26 June
Daniel Asenov (BUL)	4
Billal Bennama (FRA)	1
Dmytro Zamotayev (UKR)	0
Galal Yafai (GBR)	5
Manuel Cappai (ITA)	5
Nodari Darbaidze (GEO)	0
Baregham Harutyunyan (ARM)	0
Gabriel Escobar (ESP)	5

Semifinals; 28 June
Daniel Asenov (BUL)	3
Galal Yafai (GBR)	2
Manuel Cappai (ITA)	1
Gabriel Escobar (ESP)	4

Final; 29 June
Daniel Asenov (BUL)	1
Gabriel Escobar (ESP)	4
