= Jasurbek Latipov =

Uzbekistani boxer

Medal record

Representing Uzbekistan

Men's amateur boxing

World Amateur Championships
Silver medal – second place	2013 Almaty	Flyweight
Silver medal – second place	2017 Hamburg	Flyweight
Bronze medal – third place	2011 Baku	Flyweight

Asian Games
Gold medal – first place	2018 Jakarta-Palembang	Flyweight

Asian Championships
Gold medal – first place	2017 Tashkent	Flyweight

Summer Universiade
Bronze medal – third place	2013 Kazan	Flyweight

Jasurbek Latipov is an Uzbekistani boxer, born in Andijan. At the 2012 Summer Olympics, he competed in the Men's flyweight, but was defeated in the third round. In the 2013 World Amateur Championships, he reached the final, where he lost to Mikhail Aloyan. In 2016, Latipov won the bronze medal at the international championship in Bishkek. In 2017, he reached the final again, this time losing the Cuban boxer, Yosbany Veitia. That year, he also won the Asian Championships, beating In Kyu Kim in the final. In 2018, he won the Flyweight division at the Asian Games, beating Rogen Ladon.
