= Saken Bibossinov =

Kazakh boxer (born 1997)

Personal information
- Nationality: Kazakhstan
- Born: 3 July 1997 (age 29) Bo'stonliq, Uzbekistan
- Height: 1.69 m (5 ft 7 in)

Boxing career

Boxing record
- Total fights: 2
- Wins: 2
- Win by KO: 1
- Losses: 0
Medal record
Men's amateur boxing
Representing Kazakhstan
Olympic Games
Bronze medal – third place	2020 Tokyo	Flyweight
IBA World Championships
Gold medal – first place	2021 Belgrade	Flyweight
Gold medal – first place	2025 Dubai	Bantamweight
Bronze medal – third place	2019 Yekaterinburg	Flyweight
Asian Championships
Silver medal – second place	2022 Amman	Flyweight
Bronze medal – third place	2021 Dubai	Flyweight

Saken Ismadiyar ugli Bibosinov (Kazakh: Сакен Исмадияр угли Бибосинов, born 3 July 1997) is a Kazakh amateur boxer.

He won a medal at the 2019 AIBA World Boxing Championships.

== Amateur career ==
=== National tournaments ===
Bibossinov took part in the 2018 Kazakh National Championships, held in Aktau, Kazakhstan between 13 and 18 November 2018. He won the silver medal after beating Abay Kuandykov by split decision in the semifinals, but losing by unanimous decision to Anvar Muzaparov in the tournament finals. Bibossinov added another national medal to his record on 7 May 2019, after he beat Yevgeniy Pavlov in the finals of the 5th Kazakhstan national boxing games. Bibossinov won his third national medal of the year on 20 July 2019, as he beat Makhmud Sabyrkhan by split decision in the finals of the President's Cup.

Bibossinov took part in the 2020 National boxing championships as well, which were held in late November in Shymkent, Kazakhstan. He earned his place in the finals after beating Timur Kabdeshov by unanimous decision in the quarterfinals and Damir Abdykadyr by unanimous decision in the semifinals. Bibossinov once again fell short in the finals of the national tournament, as he lost a majority decision to Makhmud Sabyrkhan.

=== World championships ===
Bibossinov participated in the 2019 World Championships, held in Yekaterinburg, Russia, and faced Enkhmandakh Kharkhuu in the opening round of the tournament. He won the fight by split decision. Bibossinov advanced to the round of 16, where he faced the 2016 Summer Olympics light flyweight silver medalist Yuberjen Martínez. He won the fight by unanimous decision. Bibossinov faced the 2019 European Games light-flyweight gold medalist Artur Hovhannisyan in the tournament quarterfinals. He won the fight by majority decision, guaranteeing himself a bronze medal. Bibossinov faced Amit Panghal in the penultimate bout of the world championships. He lost the fight by split decision.

Bibossinov competed as a flyweight in the 2021 World Boxing Championships as well, and was booked to face the 2016 Olympic Games gold medal winner Hasanboy Dusmatov in the opening round of the tournament. He won the fight by unanimous decision. Bibossinov advanced to the round of 16, where he faced Deepak. He won the fight by unanimous decision. Bibossinov faced Yuberjen Martinez in the tournament quarterfinals the very next day. He once again prevailed against Martinez, as he won the fight by split decision. Bibossinov earned his place in the finals with a majority decision victory against Thanarat Saengphet in the penultimate bout of the championship. Bibossinov won his career-first world championships gold medal after beating Roscoe Hill by unanimous decision in the tournament finals.

=== Olympic games ===
Bibossinov earned his place in the 2020 Summer Olympics by beating Carlo Paalam by majority decision on 11 March 2020, at the Asia/Oceania Olympic Qualifying Tournament. Bibossinov competed in the flyweight event of the Belgrade Winner Tournament, held in Belgrade, Serbia. He earned his place in the tournament finals after beating Theo Ticout by unanimous decision in the quarterfinals and Cosmin Girleanu by unanimous decision in the semifinals. Bibossinov was awarded the gold medal after he beat Azat Usenaliev by unanimous decision.

Bibossinov faced the 2019 Pan American Games bronze medalist Yankiel Rivera in the opening round of the 2020 Summer Olympics. He won the fight by split decision. Bibossinov next faced the 2019 World Championships bronze medalist Billal Bennama in the round of 16. He won the fight by unanimous decision. Bibossinov faced Gabriel Escobar in the tournament quarterfinals. He won the fight by split decision, which guaranteed him at least the bronze medal. Bibossinov lost a split decision to the eventual gold medalist Galal Yafai in semifinals.

== Professional boxing record ==
2 fights	2 wins	0 losses
By knockout	1	0
By decision	1	0

No.	Result	Record	Opponent	Type	Round, time	Date	Location	Notes
2	Win	2–0	Adilet Kachkynbekov	UD	6	26 Oct 2025	Bishkek Arena, Bishkek, Kyrgyzstan	
1	Win	1–0	Christian Legane	KO	1 (6), 3:00	20 Jul 2025	Bishkek Arena, Bishkek, Kyrgyzstan	
