= Carlo Paalam =

Filipino boxer (born 1998)

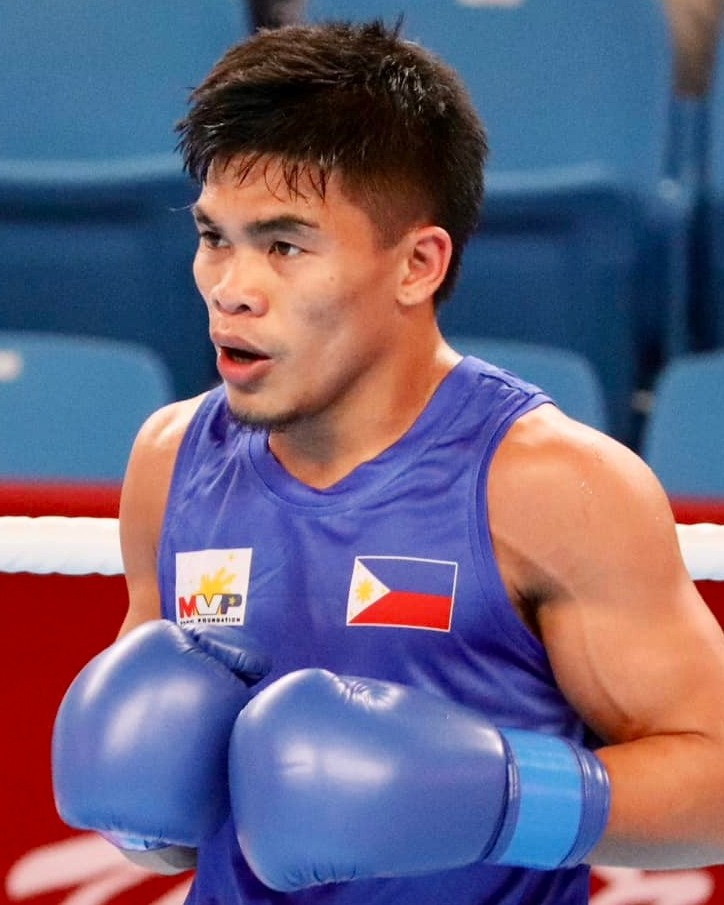
- Paalam in 2023

Personal information
- Nationality: Filipino
- Born: July 16, 1998 (age 28) Talakag, Bukidnon, Philippines
- Height: 163 cm (5 ft 4 in)

Sport
- Sport: Boxing
- Weight class: Flyweight
- Club: Team CdeO
- Coached by: Elmer Pamisa
Medal record
Representing Philippines
Event	1st	2nd	3rd
Olympic Games	0	1	0
Asian Games	0	1	1
Asian Championships	1	0	0
Southeast Asian Games	2	0	0
Total	3	2	1
Olympic Games
Silver medal – second place	2020 Tokyo	Flyweight
Asian Games
Silver medal – second place	2026 Aichi–Nagoya	Bantamweight
Bronze medal – third place	2018 Jakarta	Flyweight
Asian Championships
Gold medal – first place	2022 Amman	Bantamweight
Southeast Asian Games
Gold medal – first place	2023 Cambodia	Bantamweight
Gold medal – first place	2019 Philippines	Flyweight

Carlo Cano Paalam (Tagalog pronunciation: [pɐˈʔalɐm]; born July 16, 1998) is a Filipino amateur boxer. He made his Olympic debut and won silver medal in the flyweight division at the 2020 Summer Olympics in Tokyo, Japan.

== Early life ==
Paalam was born on July 16, 1998, in Talakag, Bukidnon. He spent some time of his childhood in Balingoan, Misamis Oriental. His mother left his father after a failed marriage when Carlo was just six years old. After the estrangement, Carlo Paalam, his father and siblings left Balingoan for Cagayan de Oro for better opportunities. Paalam then worked as a scavenger at a landfill in the city. His neighbor encouraged him to join a local tournament known as "Boxing at the Park" after seeing him in a backyard boxing match. He won his first boxing match at age 7 and used his winnings to buy rice for his family.

== Career ==
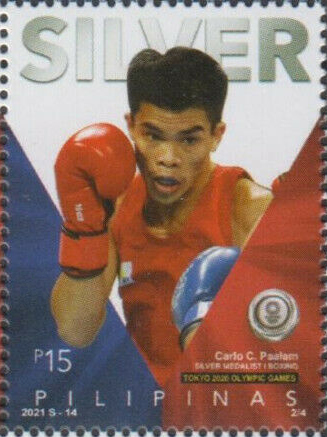
Carlo Paalam on a 2021 stamp of the Philippines

He was scouted by local officials by Zedrick Ramos in 2009 after figuring in the Boxing at the Park tournament and was placed under Cagayan de Oro's boxing training program. Paalam then joined the Philippine national team in 2013 and started competing for international level. He took home bronze medals both at the AIBA Youth Asian and World Championships in 2016, and at the Asian Games in 2018. He took part in the 2017 Southeast Asian Games in Malaysia, but did not medal.

He bagged gold medals in the ASTANA/President's Cup in Kazakhstan in 2017, 10th AIBA International Boxing Tournament, and 1st Thailand International Boxing Tournament in 2018.

In 2019, he took home his first Southeast Asian Games gold medal at the 2019 Southeast Asian Games which was hosted at home in the Philippines.

He made his debut at the 2020 Summer Olympics in Tokyo in July 2021 after qualifying through the IOC-BTF standings “by virtue of their highest standings in their respective weight categories (in the Olympic qualifying rankings)”, after the remaining qualifying tournaments at that time were cancelled due to the COVID-19 pandemic. He pulled a victory by a split decision against Irish flyweight boxer Brendan Irvine and advanced to the Round 16 Quarterfinals. He then won by a Unanimous Decision against World Championship Silver and bronze medalist Mohamed Flissi of Algeria. He then pulled an upset victory against reigning Olympic gold medalist Shakhobidin Zoirov of Uzbekistan by a 4–1 split decision as the fight was halted due to both fighters having cuts and injuries while fighting. Paalam advances to the semifinals against Ryomei Tanaka of Japan. Paalam would defeat Tanaka by a unanimous decision (5–0) to advance to the gold medal match against British boxer Galal Yafai. Paalam fought Yafai in the finals of the men's flyweight event but lost to a 4–1 split decision. He became the fourth medalist to bring home an olympic medal for the Philippines at the 2020 Summer Olympics in Tokyo as he brought home a silver medal in the men's flyweight boxing event.

=== Olympic Games results ===
Tokyo – 2020 (Men's Flyweight)

- Round of 32: Defeated Brendan Irvine (Ireland) by SD, 4–1
- Round of 16: Defeated Mohamed Flissi (Algeria) by UD, 5–0
- Quarterfinal: Defeated Shakhobidin Zoirov (Uzbekistan) by SD, 4–1
- Semifinal: Defeated Ryomei Tanaka (Japan) by UD, 5–0
- Final: Lost against Galal Yafai (Great Britain) by SD, 1–4 (won silver medal)

Paris - 2024 (Men's 57 kg)

- Round of 32: Drew Bye
- Round of 16: Defeated Jude Gallagher (Ireland) by UD, 5-0
- Quarterfinal: Lost against Charlie Senior (Australia) by SD, 2-3

== In popular media ==
Paalam's life leading to his silver medal win in the 2020 Summer Olympics was dramatized in an episode of Maalaala Mo Kaya, a drama anthology series, aired on January 8, 2022. He was portrayed by CJ Navato.

Olympic Games
Preceded by Asa Miller	Flagbearer for Philippines (with Nesthy Petecio); Paris 2024	Succeeded by Incumbent
