= Boxing at the 2018 Asian Games =

Boxing competitions

- Venue: Jakarta International Expo
- Dates: 24 August – 1 September 2018
- Competitors: 194 from 31 nations

Boxing at the 2018 Asian Games was held at Halls C1, C2, and C3 of Jakarta International Expo, Jakarta, Indonesia, from 24 August to 1 September 2018.

== Schedule ==
P	Round of 32	R	Round of 16	¼	Quarterfinals	½	Semifinals	F	Final

Event↓/Date →	24th Fri	25th Sat	26th Sun	27th Mon	28th Tue	29th Wed	30th Thu	31st Fri	1st Sat
Men's 49 kg		P		R		¼		½	F
Men's 52 kg	P		R		¼			½	F
Men's 56 kg		P		R		¼		½	F
Men's 60 kg	P		R		¼			½	F
Men's 64 kg		P		R		¼		½	F
Men's 69 kg	P		R		¼			½	F
Men's 75 kg		P		R		¼		½	F
Women's 51 kg	P		R			¼		½	F
Women's 57 kg	R				¼			½	F
Women's 60 kg		R			¼			½	F

== Medalists ==
=== Men ===
Event	Gold	Silver	Bronze
Light flyweight (49 kg)	Amit Panghal; India	Hasanboy Dusmatov; Uzbekistan	Wu Zhonglin; China
Light flyweight (49 kg)	Amit Panghal; India	Hasanboy Dusmatov; Uzbekistan	Carlo Paalam; Philippines
Flyweight (52 kg)	Jasurbek Latipov; Uzbekistan	Rogen Ladon; Philippines	Azat Usenaliev; Kyrgyzstan
Flyweight (52 kg)	Jasurbek Latipov; Uzbekistan	Rogen Ladon; Philippines	Yuttapong Tongdee; Thailand
Bantamweight (56 kg)	Mirazizbek Mirzakhalilov; Uzbekistan	Jo Hyo-nam; North Korea	Xu Boxiang; China
Bantamweight (56 kg)	Mirazizbek Mirzakhalilov; Uzbekistan	Jo Hyo-nam; North Korea	Sunan Agung Amoragam; Indonesia
Lightweight (60 kg)	Erdenebatyn Tsendbaatar; Mongolia	Shunkor Abdurasulov; Uzbekistan	Rujakran Juntrong; Thailand
Lightweight (60 kg)	Erdenebatyn Tsendbaatar; Mongolia	Shunkor Abdurasulov; Uzbekistan	Shan Jun; China
Light welterweight (64 kg)	Ikboljon Kholdarov; Uzbekistan	Baatarsükhiin Chinzorig; Mongolia	Daisuke Narimatsu; Japan
Light welterweight (64 kg)	Ikboljon Kholdarov; Uzbekistan	Baatarsükhiin Chinzorig; Mongolia	Wuttichai Masuk; Thailand
Welterweight (69 kg)	Bobo-Usmon Baturov; Uzbekistan	Aslanbek Shymbergenov; Kazakhstan	Zeyad Ishaish; Jordan
Welterweight (69 kg)	Bobo-Usmon Baturov; Uzbekistan	Aslanbek Shymbergenov; Kazakhstan	Sailom Adi; Thailand
Middleweight (75 kg)	Israil Madrimov; Uzbekistan	Abilkhan Amankul; Kazakhstan	Vikas Krishan Yadav; India
Middleweight (75 kg)	Israil Madrimov; Uzbekistan	Abilkhan Amankul; Kazakhstan	Eumir Marcial; Philippines

=== Women ===
Event	Gold	Silver	Bronze
Flyweight (51 kg)	Chang Yuan; China	Pang Chol-mi; North Korea	Lin Yu-ting; Chinese Taipei
Flyweight (51 kg)	Chang Yuan; China	Pang Chol-mi; North Korea	Nguyễn Thị Tâm; Vietnam
Featherweight (57 kg)	Yin Junhua; China	Jo Son-hwa; North Korea	Huang Hsiao-wen; Chinese Taipei
Featherweight (57 kg)	Yin Junhua; China	Jo Son-hwa; North Korea	Nilawan Techasuep; Thailand
Lightweight (60 kg)	Oh Yeon-ji; South Korea	Sudaporn Seesondee; Thailand	Huswatun Hasanah; Indonesia
Lightweight (60 kg)	Oh Yeon-ji; South Korea	Sudaporn Seesondee; Thailand	Choe Hye-song; North Korea

== Medal table ==
Rank	Nation	Gold	Silver	Bronze	Total
1	Uzbekistan (UZB)	5	2	0	7
2	China (CHN)	2	0	3	5
3	Mongolia (MGL)	1	1	0	2
4	India (IND)	1	0	1	2
5	South Korea (KOR)	1	0	0	1
6	North Korea (PRK)	0	3	1	4
7	Kazakhstan (KAZ)	0	2	0	2
8	Thailand (THA)	0	1	5	6
9	Philippines (PHI)	0	1	2	3
10	Chinese Taipei (TPE)	0	0	2	2
10	Indonesia (INA)	0	0	2	2
12	Japan (JPN)	0	0	1	1
12	Jordan (JOR)	0	0	1	1
12	Kyrgyzstan (KGZ)	0	0	1	1
12	Vietnam (VIE)	0	0	1	1
Totals (15 entries)		10	10	20	40

== Participating nations ==
A total of 194 athletes from 31 nations competed in boxing at the 2018 Asian Games:

- Afghanistan (4)
- Bhutan (7)
- China (10)
- Chinese Taipei (6)
- India (10)
- Indonesia (10)
- Iran (3)
- Iraq (4)
- Japan (8)
- Jordan (3)
- Kazakhstan (10)
- Kyrgyzstan (7)
- Laos (4)
- Macau (1)
- Malaysia (1)
- Mongolia (10)
- Nepal (8)
- Pakistan (8)
- Philippines (8)
- North Korea (8)
- Qatar (3)
- South Korea (10)
- Sri Lanka (6)
- Syria (2)
- Tajikistan (4)
- Thailand (10)
- Timor-Leste (5)
- Turkmenistan (7)
- United Arab Emirates (3)
- Uzbekistan (8)
- Vietnam (6)
