= Boxing at the 2018 Asian Games – Men's 52 kg =

Boxing competitions

Men's 52 kg at the 2018 Asian Games
- Venue: Jakarta International Expo
- Date: 24 August – 1 September 2018
- Competitors: 21 from 21 nations

Medalists
gold medal	Jasurbek Latipov	Uzbekistan
silver medal	Rogen Ladon	Philippines
bronze medal	Azat Usenaliev	Kyrgyzstan
bronze medal	Yuttapong Tongdee	Thailand

The men's flyweight (52 kilograms) event at the 2018 Asian Games took place from 24 August to 1 September 2018 at Jakarta International Expo Hall, Jakarta, Indonesia.

== Schedule ==
All times are Western Indonesia Time (UTC+07:00)

Date	Time	Event
Friday, 24 August 2018	14:00	Round of 32
Sunday, 26 August 2018	13:00	Round of 16
Tuesday, 28 August 2018	13:00	Quarterfinals
Friday, 31 August 2018	14:00	Semifinals
Saturday, 1 September 2018	14:00	Final

== Results ==
Legend

- RSC — Won by referee stop contest
- WO — Won by walkover

=== Final ===
Final
Jasurbek Latipov (UZB)	RSC
Rogen Ladon (PHI)

=== Top half ===
Round of 32
Trần Văn Thảo (VIE)	0
Hu Jianguan (CHN)	5
Zarip Jumaýew (TKM)	0
O Tae-bom (PRK)	5
Azat Usenaliev (KGZ)	5
Viengxay Akkhasith (LAO)	0

Round of 16
Jasurbek Latipov (UZB)	3
Hu Jianguan (CHN)	2
João Ximenes (TLS)	0
Aldoms Suguro (INA)	5
Tenzin Drugyel (BHU)	0
O Tae-bom (PRK)	5
Azat Usenaliev (KGZ)	5
Syed Muhammad Asif (PAK)	0

Quarterfinals
Jasurbek Latipov (UZB)	4
Aldoms Suguro (INA)	1
O Tae-bom (PRK)	0
Azat Usenaliev (KGZ)	5

Semifinals
Jasurbek Latipov (UZB)	4
Azat Usenaliev (KGZ)	1

=== Bottom half ===
Round of 32
Ryomei Tanaka (JPN)	5
Gaurav Solanki (IND)	0
Sultan Al-Nuaimi (UAE)
Azat Mahmetov (KAZ)	WO

Round of 16
Gankhuyagiin Gan-Erdene (MGL)	4
Ryomei Tanaka (JPN)	1
Yuttapong Tongdee (THA)	RSC
Vidanalange Bandara (SRI)
Rogen Ladon (PHI)	5
Prem Chaudhary (NEP)	0
Azat Mahmetov (KAZ)	4
Kim In-kyu (KOR)	1

Quarterfinals
Gankhuyagiin Gan-Erdene (MGL)	2
Yuttapong Tongdee (THA)	3
Rogen Ladon (PHI)	3
Azat Mahmetov (KAZ)	2

Semifinals
Yuttapong Tongdee (THA)	0
Rogen Ladon (PHI)	5
