= Yoel Finol =

Venezuelan boxer (born 1996)

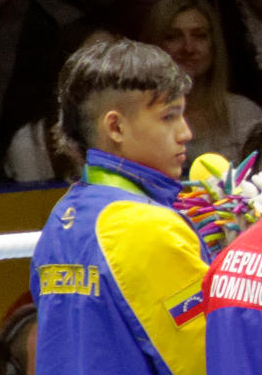
- Finol in 2015

Personal information
- Born: Yoel Segundo Finol Rivas; 21 September 1996 (age 29) El Vigía, Venezuela
- Height: 1.67 m (5 ft 6 in)
- Weight: Bantamweight

Boxing career
- Stance: Southpaw

Boxing record
- Total fights: 3
- Wins: 3
- Win by KO: 1
- Losses: 0
Medal record
Men's amateur boxing
Representing Venezuela
Olympic Games
Silver medal – second place	2016 Rio Janeiro	Flyweight
Pan American Games
Bronze medal – third place	2015 Toronto	Light Flyweight
South American Games
Gold medal – first place	2018 Cochabamba	Bantamweight

Yoel Segundo Finol Rivas (born 21 September 1996) is a Venezuelan professional boxer. As an amateur he was awarded the silver medal at the 2016 Summer Olympics after the original silver medalist, Mikhail Aloyan, was disqualified following a failed drugs test.

== Amateur career ==
=== Olympic results ===
Rio 2016

- Round of 32: Defeated Leonel de los Santos (Dominican Republic) 3–0
- Round of 16: Defeated Muhammad Ali (Great Britain) 3–0
- Quarter-finals: Defeated Mohamed Flissi (Algeria) 3–0
- Semi-finals: Defeated by Shakhobidin Zoirov (Uzbekistan) 3–0

Tokyo 2020

- Round of 32: Defeated by Ryomei Tanaka (Japan) 5–0

=== Pan American Games result ===
Toronto 2015

- Preliminaries: Defeated PG Tondo (Canada) 3–0
- Quarter-finals: Defeated Yuberjen Martínez (Colombia) 3–0
- Semi-finals: Defeated by Joahnys Argilagos (Cuba) 2–1

== Professional career ==
Finol made his professional debut on 6 July 2019 against Jeyson Cervantes. Finol knocked his Colombian opponent down twice en route to a fourth-round technical knockout victory.

On 19 December 2019, Finol fought for a second time as a professional against Carmelo Marmol. Finol was taken the distance as he won via wide unanimous decision after winning every round on each of the three scorecards. Almost a year after his last fight, Finol returned to the ring against Javier Martinez on 17 December 2020. Finol won a comfortable unanimous decision after dominating his Colombian opponent throughout the bout.

== Personal life ==
Finol's elder sister Carolina was married to, and later murdered by former WBA super featherweight and WBC lightweight world champion Edwin Valero.

== Professional boxing record ==
3 fights	3 wins	0 losses
By knockout	1	0
By decision	2	0

No.	Result	Record	Opponent	Type	Round, time	Date	Location	Notes
3	Win	3–0	Javier Martinez	UD	6	17 Dec 2020	Discoteca Kilymandiaro, Puerto Colombia, Colombia	
2	Win	2–0	Carmelo Marmol	UD	6	19 Dec 2019	Coliseo Sugar Baby Rojas, Barranquilla, Colombia	
1	Win	1–0	Jeyson Cervantes	TKO	4 (6), 0:26	6 Jul 2019	Coliseo Sugar Baby Rojas, Barranquilla, Colombia	
