= Martín Molina =

Spanish boxer

Personal information
- Nationality: Spain
- Born: Martín Molina Salvador; 2 November 1994 (age 31)
- Height: 159 cm (5 ft 3 in)

Boxing career
- Weight class: Flyweight
Medal record
Men's amateur boxing
Representing Spain
European Championships
Gold medal – first place	2022 Yerevan	Flyweight
IBA World Championships
Bronze medal – third place	2023 Tashkent	Flyweight

Martín Molina Salvador (Note: In this Spanish name, the first or paternal surname is Molina and the second or maternal family name is Salvador.) (born 2 November 1994) is a Spanish boxer. He competed at the 2022 European Amateur Boxing Championships, winning the gold medal in the flyweight event. He also competed at the 2023 IBA Men's World Boxing Championships, winning the bronze medal in the same event.
