= Akash Kumar =

Indian boxer

Personal information
- Nationality: India

Boxing career
Medal record
Men's amateur boxing
Representing India
IBA World Championships
Bronze medal – third place	2021 Belgrade	Bantamweight

Akash Kumar is an Indian boxer. His first international appearance was competing at the 2021 AIBA World Boxing Championships, winning the bronze medal in the bantamweight event.

== Career ==
Akash won bronze in the 2021 AIBA World Boxing Championships, being the only Indian boxer to place on the podium that year. While competing, his mother died, and her death was kept secret from him.

Akash won gold at the Boxam Elite International 2026 in the Elite Tournament held at La Nucia, Alicante in Spain.

== Awards ==
- The Times of India Times of India Sports Awards Boxer of the Year: 2021
