= Deepak Bhoria =

Indian boxer

Personal information
- Nationality: India
- Born: 1997 or 1998 (age 28–29)

Boxing career
Medal record
Men's amateur boxing
Representing India
IBA World Championships
Bronze medal – third place	2023 Tashkent	Flyweight

Deepak Bhoria (born 1997/1998) is an Indian boxer. He competed at the 2023 IBA Men's World Boxing Championships, winning the bronze medal in the flyweight event.
