= Batuhan Çiftçi =

Turkish boxer (born 1997)

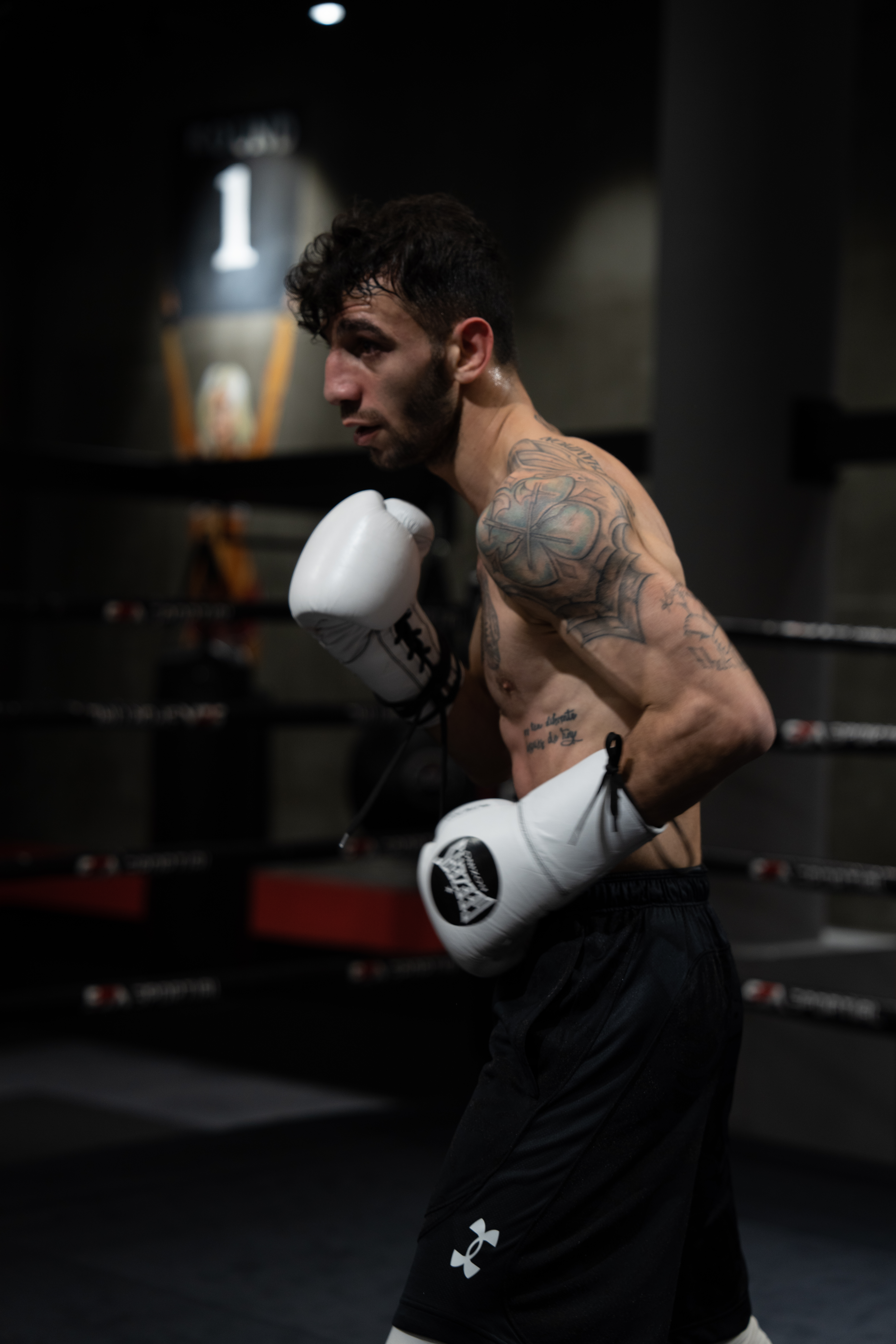

Personal information
- Nationality: Turkish
- Born: 16 December 1997 (age 28) Üsküdar, Istanbul, Turkey
- Height: 1.73 m (5 ft 8 in)
- Weight: 57 kg (126 lb)

Boxing career
Medal record
Men's amateur boxing
Representing Turkey
Mediterranean Games
Gold medal – first place	2022 Oran	Featherweight

Batuhan Çiftçi (born 16 December 1997) is a Turkish boxer in the (-52 kg) discipline. He received a quota for the 2020 Summer Olympics.

Batuhan Çiftçi was born in Üsküdar, Istanbul, Turkey on 16 December 1997.

He started boxing in around 2008. The 1.73 m (5 ft 8 in) tall athlete at 57 kg is a member of Fenerbahçe Boxing.

He competed at the 2018 Mediterranean Games in Tarragona, Spain, the 2019 AIBA World Championships in Yekaterinburg, Russia, and the 2019 European Games in Minsk, Belarus. He won the bronze medal at the 2020 European Boxing Olympic Qualification Tournament in London, United Kingdom. He obtained a quota for the 2020 Summer Olympics.
