= Koryun Soghomonyan =

Armenian boxer

Personal information
- Nationality: Armenian
- Born: 16 May 1993 (age 31); Zovuni, Armenia

Sport
- Sport: Boxing

Koryun Soghomonyan (born 16 May 1993) is an Armenian boxer. He competed in the men's flyweight event at the 2020 Summer Olympics, as well as two editions of the World Championships in 2013 and 2015.
