= Mohammad Nazari =

- Known for: Prisoner of conscience, hunger strike

Mohammad Nazari (born 1971; Persian: محمد نظری) is an Azeri-Kurdish political prisoner from Iran. Nazari was arrested on May 30, 1994, by the Ministry of Intelligence in Bukan, West Azerbaijan Province, and was sentenced to death for his alleged membership in the Democratic Party of Iranian Kurdistan (PDKI). His sentence was later reduced to life imprisonment during the 1999 Eid-e-Qorban pardons by the Supreme Leader of Iran.

In 2012, Nazari sewed his lips and went on hunger strike in protest of authorities' disregard for his pleads. His demands were not met. As of 2017, Nazari has spent 24 years behind bars without any leave of absence, and his health has deteriorated as a result of protracted hunger strikes.

== Arrest ==
Nazari is a political prisoner who was arrested Bukan, West Azerbaijan province of Iran on May 30, 1994, on the vague charges of "acting against national security" and Moharebeh (enmity against God) through an alleged effective membership of Democratic Party of Iranian Kurdistan. Nazari was transferred to prison in Mahabad after being jailed in detention of Iran's Intelligence Service in Bukan for three months. He was sentenced to death by Branch 1 of the Islamic revolutionary Court in absentia. He was deprived of the rights of having a lawyer. The court was chaired by Judge Jalilizadeh. The death sentence was commuted to a life-time imprisonment on May 30, 1999, after the general amnesty by the Supreme Leader of Iran. He was forcibly confessed against himself during interrogation, local human rights activists reported. The political prisoner Mr. Nazari should be released four years ago under the Iran's Islamic Penal Code which was approved in 2013. The latest Islamic Penal Code version announces that the life-time imprisonment should be reduced to a 15-year prison term, but, his release has so far been prevented because of the illegal interference by security agents. He has frequently started prolonged Hunger Strikes coming out in objection to the unknown situation he has been undergone. He started a Hunger Strike on Tuesday, August 28, 2012, for the first time which lasted for 48 days. He sewed his lips. He is on a prolonged Hunger Strike in Rajai Shahr prison in Oct, 2017. He started the Hunger Strike till his demands (fair trial) to be met.

== See also ==
- Arash Sadeghi
- Human rights in Iran
