= Shahriyor Akhmedov =

Russian boxer

Personal information
- Nationality: Tajikistani
- Born: 3 June 1993 (age 33) Dushanbe, Tajikistan

Sport
- Sport: Boxing

Shahriyor Akhmedov (Tajik: Шаҳриёр Саидович Ахмедов, born June 3, 1993, Dushanbe, Tajikistan) is a Russian Tajik boxer. He is a five-time winner of the Russian Championship (2015–2019), a bronze medalist at the 2019 Military World Games, and winner of an International Master of Sports of Russia award (2016).

== Biography ==
Akhmedov was born in Dushanbe to a Tajik family. Initially, he tried wrestling – judo, freestyle wrestling, and classics. In 2006, when he was 13 years old, he accidentally got into a boxing school in Yakka-Chinar, where the boxer Sherali Dostiev was based. His high technique amazed Shahriyor, and he began to train under his supervision. When his coach left for the US, he trained with his brother Bakhriddin Dostiev and then with Abdurrashid Mamajonov.

In 2016 he was awarded the title of "International Master of Sports of Russia".

In 2021, he continued his career in professional boxing.

Shahriyor lives in Novosibirsk.

== Sports achievements ==
- Russian Boxing Championship 2015 — (silver)
- Russian Boxing Championship 2016 — (silver)
- Russian Boxing Championship 2017 — (silver)
- Russian Boxing Championship 2018 — (silver)
- Russian Boxing Championship 2019 — (bronze)
- Military World Games 2019 — (bronze)
