= Malik Jackson (boxer) =

American boxer (born 1994)

Malik Jackson (born August 9, 1994) is an amateur boxer from Washington, DC.

Jackson won the 2010-11 junior Olympic USA boxing title.

Jackson is a two-time USA Boxing flyweight champion.

At the 2013 AIBA World Boxing Championships Jackson won his first match by technical knockout to Vivaldo Rodrigues. Jackson lost in his second match to eventual bronze medal winner Andrew Selby.
