= Amit Panghal =

Indian boxer (born 1995)

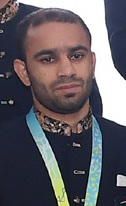
- Panghal in August 2022

Personal information
- Born: 16 October 1995 (age 31) Mayna, Rohtak, Haryana, India
- Height: 5 ft 2 in (157 cm)
- Weight: 52 kg (115 lb)

Boxing career
- Weight class: Flyweight, Light flyweight
Medal record
Men's amateur boxing
Representing India
| Event | 1st | 2nd | 3rd |
|---|---|---|---|
| World Boxing Championships | - | 1 | - |
| Asian Games | 1 | - | - |
| Commonwealth Games | 1 | 1 | - |
| Asian Boxing Championships | 1 | 1 | 1 |
| Total | 3 | 3 | 1 |
World Championships
| Silver medal – second place | 2019 Yekaterinburg | Flyweight |
Asian Games
| Gold medal – first place | 2018 Jakarta Palembang | Light Flyweight |
Commonwealth Games
| Gold medal – first place | 2022 Birmingham | Light Flyweight |
| Silver medal – second place | 2018 Gold Coast | Light Flyweight |
Asian Championships
| Gold medal – first place | 2019 Bangkok | Flyweight |
| Silver medal – second place | 2021 Dubai | Flyweight |
| Bronze medal – third place | 2017 Tashkent | Light flyweight |

Subedar Amit Panghal (born 16 October 1995) is an Indian Army Junior Commissioned Officer (JCO) and an amateur boxer. He won silver medal at the 2019 AIBA World Boxing Championships in the Flyweight division. Panghal won a gold medal at the 2018 Asian Games.

== Personal life ==
Panghal was born on 16 October 1995 in Mayna village of Rohtak, Haryana. His father, Vijender Singh Panghal, is a farmer in Mayna, while his elder brother, Ajay Panghal, works in the Indian Army. Ajay, a former amateur boxer, inspired Amit to take up boxing in 2007 at Sir Chhoturam Boxing Academy.

As of March 2018, Panghal is serving the Indian Army as a junior commissioned officer (JCO). He is serving in 22nd Battalion The Mahar Regiment.

== Career ==
Panghal won the gold medal in his debut appearance at the National Boxing Championships in 2017. He won the bronze medal in the light flyweight category of the 2017 Asian Amateur Boxing Championships in Tashkent in May 2017, and qualified for the 2017 AIBA World Boxing Championships, where he was beaten in the quarterfinal by Hasanboy Dusmatov of Uzbekistan.

In February 2018, Panghal won the gold medal at the Strandzha Cup in Sofia. He won the silver medal at 2018 Commonwealth Games in the light flyweight category. In April 2019 he won the gold medal at Asian Boxing Championship 2019 at Bangkok Defeated by Korean boxer Kim In-kyu (bronze medalist world boxing championship 2017).

On 11 September 2018, he was nominated for the Arjuna Awards on recommendation by the Boxing Federation of India in view of his stellar performance in the Asian Games. In February 2019, Amit Panghal successfully defended cup by winning consecutive (2018, 2019) gold medal at the Strandzha Cup in Sofia.

On 21 September 2019, he became the first Indian boxer to win silver medal at the 2019 AIBA World Boxing Championships. Panghal lost to Shakhobidin Zoirov of Uzbekistan in 52 kg category final by 0–5, settling with a silver medal.

On 10 March 2020, Panghal qualified for the 2020 Tokyo Olympics after he defeated Philippines' Carlo Paalam in the 52 kg quarterfinal. In December, Panghal won a gold medal in Boxing World Cup 2020 held in Cologne, Germany. He was also given a walkover by his opponent Argishti Terteryan from Germany.

On 25 April 2021, Panghal won bronze medal in Governor's cup 2021 at St. Petersburg, Russia in 52 kg category.

On 31 May 2021, Panghal won the silver medal at 2021 Asian Amateur Boxing Championships which was held at Dubai, United Arab Emirates. He lost the final bout against reigning Olympic and world champion Shakhobidin Zoirov of Uzbekistan by a 3–2 split decision. This was Pangal's third loss in succession against Zoirov.

In 2021 Asian Elite Boxing Championships, Panghal failed to defend his gold medal, that he won in 2019, against reigning Olympic and world champion Shakhobidin Zoirov of Uzbekistan to finish second-best in Dubai.

Panghal entered the 2020 Olympics as world no. 1 in the 52 kg category, but was defeated by Rio Olympics Silver Medalist Yuberjen Martínez 1–4 by a split decision.

On 9 April 2022, Panghal had to settle for a silver medal at the Thailand Open after he lost the final against Philippines’ 2018 Asian Games silver medalist Rogen Ladon. Though Pangal lost by a 2–3 split decision.

On 7 August 2022, Panghal won gold medal in Commonwealth Games 2022 at Birmingham in 51 kg flyweight category against Kiaran MacDonald by 5–0 unanimous decision.

== Honours ==
Panghal was awarded Vishisht Seva Medal in April 2020.
