= Olzhas Sattibayev =

Kazakhstani boxer (born 1988)

Personal information
- Born: 2 May 1988 (age 38) Astana, Kazakh SSR, Soviet Union

Boxing career

Olzhas Sattibayev (born 2 May 1988) is a Kazakhstani boxer. He competed in the men's flyweight event at the 2016 Summer Olympics, where he lost in the first round.
