= Hamza Touba =

German boxer (born 1991)

Personal information
- Nationality: German
- Born: 6 November 1991 (age 34) Neuss, Germany
- Height: 170 cm (5 ft 7 in)
- Weight: 52 kg (115 lb)

Sport
- Sport: Boxing
Medal record
Representing Germany
European Games
Bronze medal – third place	2015 Baku	Flyweight

Hamza Touba (born 6 November 1991) is a German boxer. He competed in the men's flyweight event at the 2016 Summer Olympics where he lost in the round of 32 to Elie Konki of France. He won a bronze medal at the 2015 European Games.
