= Achraf Kharroubi =

Moroccan boxer

Personal information
- Born: 25 September 1990 (age 35)
- Height: 160 cm (5 ft 3 in)
- Weight: 52 kg (115 lb)

Boxing career

Achraf Kharroubi (Arabic: أشرف خروبي, born 25 September 1990) is a Moroccan boxer. He competed in the men's flyweight event at the 2016 Summer Olympics where he was eliminated in the round of 16.
