= Yosvany Veitía =

Cuban boxer (born 1992)

Personal information
- Full name: Yosvany Veitía Soto
- Born: 12 March 1992 (age 34) Caibarién, Villa Clara, Cuba

Sport
- Country: Cuba
- Sport: Boxing
- Event: Light flyweight
- Coached by: Rolando Acebal
Medal record
Men's amateur boxing
Representing Cuba
World Amateur Championships
Gold medal – first place	2017 Hamburg	Flyweight
Silver medal – second place	2015 Doha	Flyweight
Bronze medal – third place	2013 Almaty	Light flyweight
Bronze medal – third place	2023 Tashkent	Bantamweight
Pan American Games
Silver medal – second place	2011 Guadalajara	Light flyweight
Silver medal – second place	2015 Toronto	Flyweight
Silver medal – second place	2019 Lima	Flyweight
Pan American Championship
Gold medal – first place	2017 Tegucigalpa	Flyweight
Central American and Caribbean Games
Gold medal – first place	2014 Veracruz	Flyweight
Youth World Championships
Bronze medal – third place	2010 Baku	Light flyweight

Yosvany Veitía Soto (also spelled Yosbany, born 12 March 1992) is a Cuban amateur boxer in the light flyweight division who competed at the 2012 Olympics. He is a southpaw.

== Career ==
At the 2010 Youth World Amateur Boxing Championships he won a bronze medal.

At the 2011 World Amateur Boxing Championships he beat Birzhan Zhakypov and two unknowns but was stopped by Mongolian defending champion Pürevdorjiin Serdamba. At the 2011 Pan American Games he lost the final to local Joselito Velázquez.

At the 2012 Summer Olympics he beat Australian Billy Ward 26:4, then lost to eventual winner Zou Shiming 10:13.

He competed in the flyweight division at the 2016 Olympics, beating Achraf Kharroubi in the round of 16 before losing to Hu Jianguan in the quarter finals.

He competed at the 2020 Summer Olympics, again at flyweight. This time he beat Sulemanu Tetteh in the round of 16, before losing to Galal Yafai in the quarter final.

He also holds two notable wins over Naoya Inoue, ranked as the world's best active boxer, pound for pound, by The Ring, TBRB, ESPN, and BoxRec.
