= Shakhobidin Zoirov =

Uzbek boxer

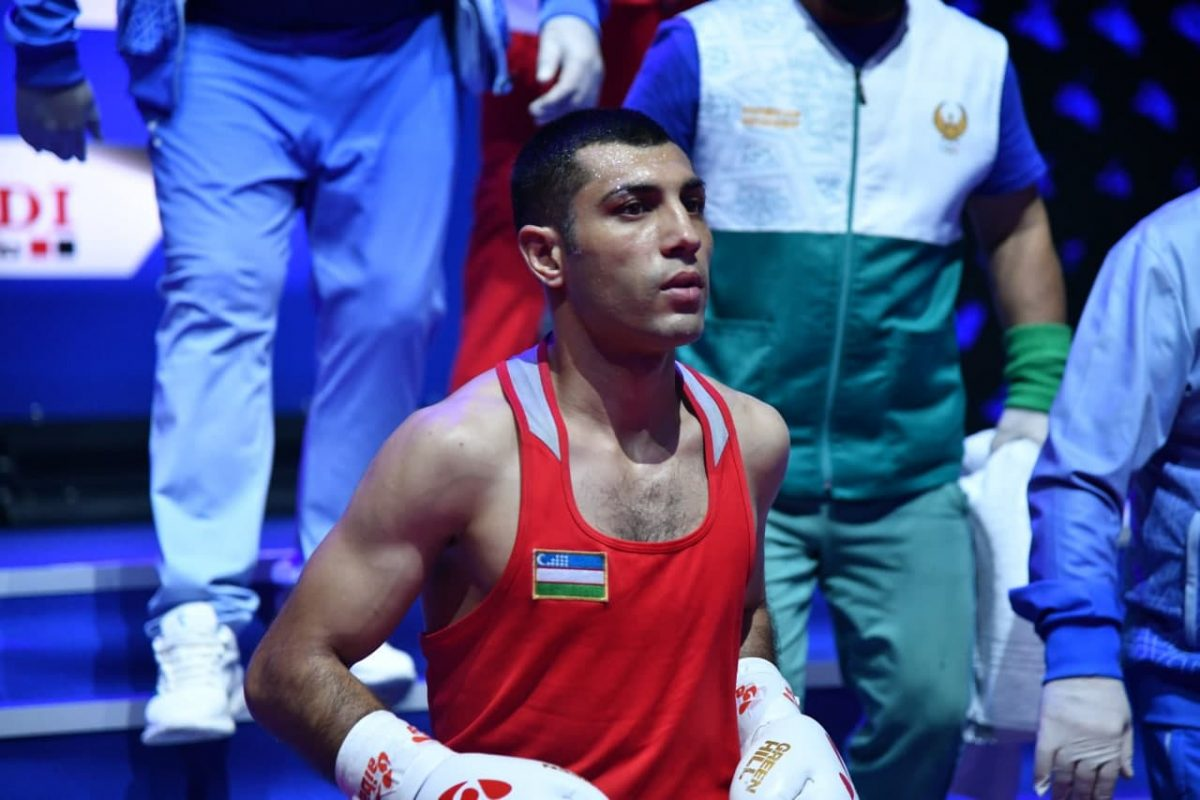

Personal information
- Nationality: Uzbek
- Born: 3 March 1993 (age 33) Kogon, Uzbekistan
- Height: 5 ft 6 1/2 in (169 cm)
- Weight: Bantamweight

Boxing career
- Reach: 67 in (170 cm)
- Stance: Southpaw

Boxing record
- Total fights: 5
- Wins: 5
- Win by KO: 3
Medal record
Men's amateur boxer
Representing Uzbekistan
Olympic Games
Gold medal – first place	2016 Rio Janeiro	Flyweight
World Championships
Gold medal – first place	2019 Yekaterinburg	Flyweight
Asian Games
Silver medal – second place	2014 Incheon	Flyweight
Asian Championships
Gold medal – first place	2021 Dubai	Flyweight
Silver medal – second place	2015 Bangkok	Flyweight
Silver medal – second place	2013 Amman	Flyweight

Shakhobidin Zoirov (Uzbek: Shahobiddin Zoirov; born 3 March 1993) is an Uzbekistani professional boxer. As an amateur he won gold medals at the 2016 Summer Olympics and the 2019 World Championships, both in the flyweight division.

== Amateur career ==
=== Olympic result ===
Rio 2016

- Round of 32: Defeated Brendan Irvine (Republic of Ireland) 3–0
- Round of 16: Defeated Antonio Vargas (USA) 3–0
- Quarter-finals: Defeated Elvin Mamishzada (Azerbaijan) 3–0
- Semi-finals: Defeated Yoel Finol (Venezuela) 3–0
- Final: Defeated Mikhail Aloyan (Russia) 3–0

=== World Championship result ===
2019 Yekaterinburg

- Round 1: Defeated Yhlas Gylychjanov (Turkmenistan) 5–0
- Round 2: Defeated Rodrigo Marte (Dominican Republic) 5–0
- Round 3: Defeated Azat Usenaliev (Kyrgyzstan) 5–0
- Quarter-finals: Defeated Daniel Asenov (Bulgaria) 5–0
- Semi-finals: Defeated Billal Bennama (France) 5–0
- Final: Defeated Amit Panghal (India) 5–0

=== Asian Games result ===
2014 Incheon

- Preliminaries 2: Defeated Chang Yong (China) 3–0
- Quarter-finals: Defeated Gaurav Bidhuri (India) 3–0
- Semi-finals: Defeated Muhammad Waseem (Pakistan) 3–0
- Final: Defeated by Ilyas Suleimenov (Kazakhstan) 2–1

== Professional career ==
Zoirov made his professional debut on 5 April 2019 against Anthony Holt, scoring a knockout (KO) victory within the first minute of the opening round.

His second fight came on 18 May 2019 against Mishiko Shubitidze. Zoirov knocked his opponent down twice en route to a first-round technical knockout (TKO) victory. He next fought Sandeep Singh Bhatti on 12 July 2019. Zoirov was taken the distance for the first time in his professional career, winning via unanimous decision (UD) over four rounds.

== Professional boxing record ==
5 fights	5 wins	0 losses
By knockout	3	0
By decision	2	0

No.	Result	Record	Opponent	Type	Round, time	Date	Location	Notes
5	Win	5–0	Gerson Larios	TKO	1 (8), 0:20	14 Aug 2023	Humo Arena, Tashkent, Uzbekistan	
4	Win	4–0	Brett Fidoe	PTS	6	11 Mar 2022	Civic Hall, Grays, England	
3	Win	3–0	Sandeep Singh Bhatti	UD	4	12 Jul 2019	King Abdullah Sports City, Jeddah, Saudi Arabia	
2	Win	2–0	Mishiko Shubitidze	TKO	1 (6), 2:20	18 May 2019	Viby Hallen, Aarhus, Denmark	
1	Win	1–0	Anthony Holt	KO	1 (6), 0:18	5 Apr 2019	Emirates Golf Club, Dubai, United Arab Emirates	
