= Elías Emigdio =

Mexican boxer (born 1991)

Personal information
- Born: 13 June 1991 (age 35) Zitlala, Guerrero, Mexico
- Height: 1.65 m (5 ft 5 in)

Boxing career
- Reach: 1.68 m (66 in)
- Stance: Orthodox

Boxing record
- Total fights: 11
- Wins: 8
- Win by KO: 3
- Losses: 1
- Draws: 2

Elías Eliseo Emigdio Abarca (born 13 June 1991) is a Mexican professional boxer. As an amateur, he competed in the men's flyweight event at the 2016 Summer Olympics, where he reached the round of 16.
