= Narek Abgaryan =

Armenian boxer (born 1992)

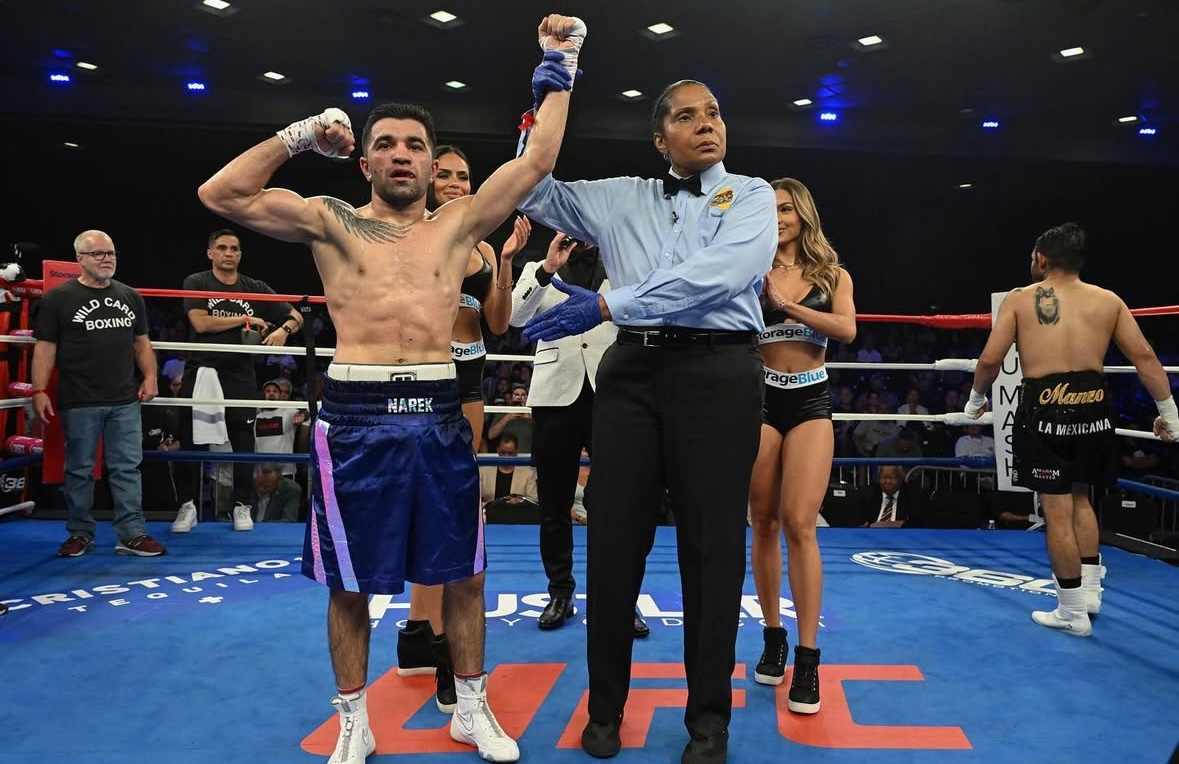
- Narek Abgaryan’s knockout win over Manuel Manzo

Personal information
- Other names: Dancing Killer
- Nationality: Armenian
- Born: Narek Abgaryan; 6 January 1992 (age 34) Vagharshapat, Armenia
- Height: 5 ft 4 in (165 cm)
- Weight: Flyweight Bantamweight Superbantamweight

Boxing career
- Reach: 67 in (170 cm)
- Stance: Orthodox

Boxing record
- Total fights: 17
- Wins: 16
- Win by KO: 7
- Losses: 1
- Draws: 0

Narek Abgaryan (born 6 January 1992) is an Armenian boxer. He competed in the men's flyweight event at the 2016 Summer Olympics, where he was eliminated in the round of 32.
