= Ryomei Tanaka =

Japanese boxer (born 1993)

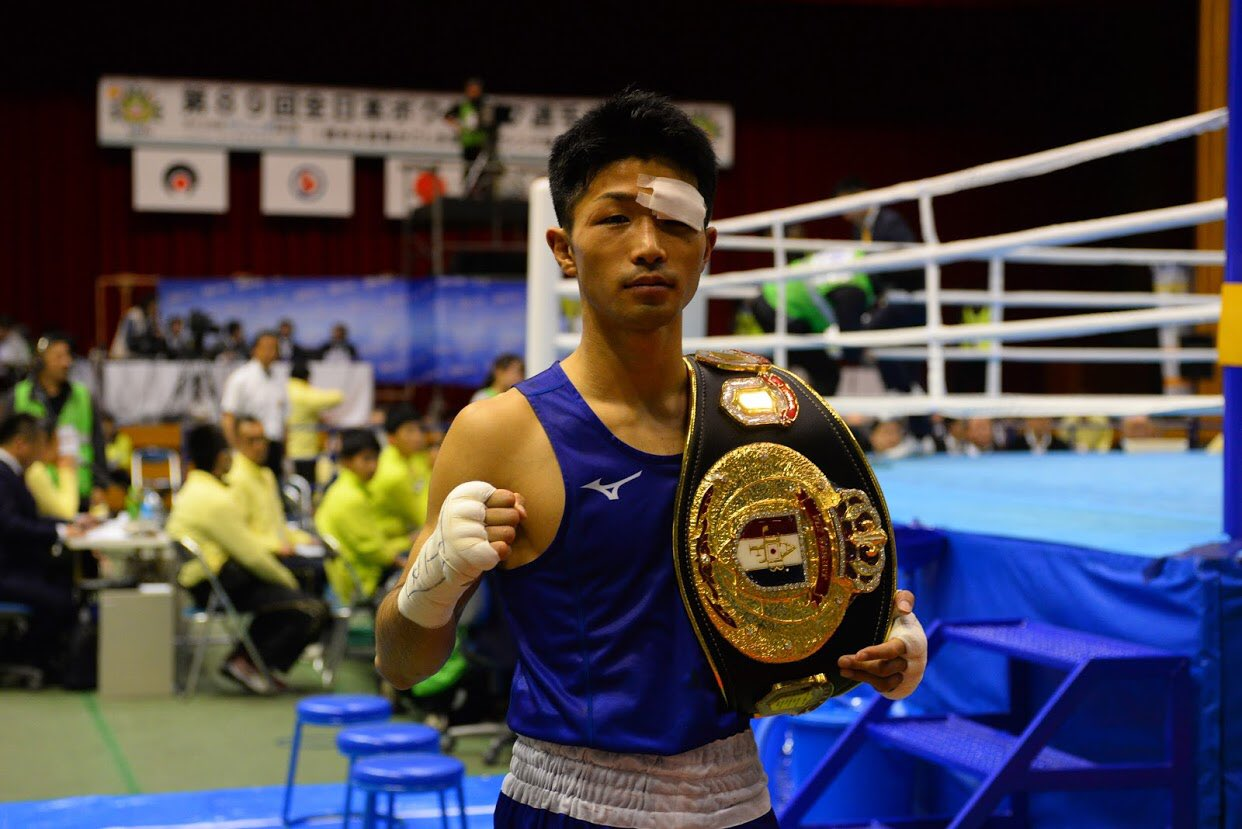
- Tanaka in 2021

Personal information
- Nationality: Japanese
- Born: 13 October 1993 (age 32) Tajimi, Gifu, Japan

Boxing career
Medal record
Men's boxing
Representing Japan
Olympic Games
Bronze medal – third place	2020 Tokyo	Flyweight

Ryomei Tanaka (田中亮明, Tanaka Ryōmei, born 13 October 1993) is a Japanese boxer. He won bronze medals flyweight division in the men's flyweight event at the 2020 Summer Olympics. His younger brother, Kosei is a former WBO triple world champion.
