= Elie Konki =

French boxer (born 1992)

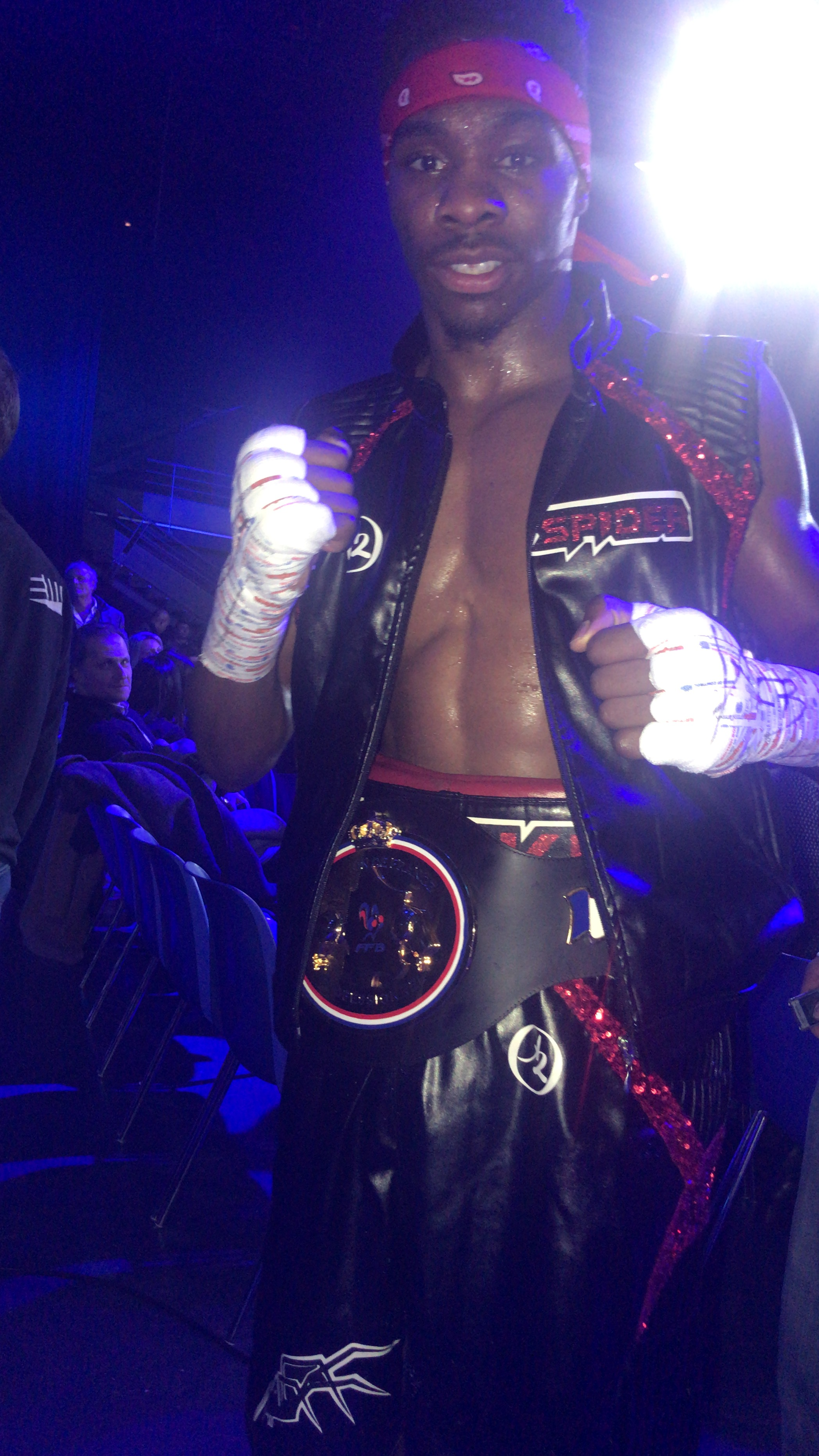
- Elie Konki in 2019

Personal information
- Nationality: French
- Born: 6 April 1992 (age 34) Meulan-en-Yvelines, France

Boxing career
- Stance: Orthodox

Boxing record
- Total fights: 16
- Wins: 14
- Win by KO: 1
- Losses: 2

Elie Konki (born 6 April 1992) is a French professional boxer. As an amateur, he competed in the men's flyweight event at the 2016 Summer Olympics, where he was eliminated in the round of 16.

== Professional boxing record ==
16 fights	14 wins	2 losses
By knockout	1	1
By decision	13	1

No.	Result	Record	Opponent	Type	Round, time	Date	Location	Notes
16	Loss	14–2	Thomas Essomba	SD	12	9 Feb 2024	Park Community Arena, Sheffield, England	For EBU European bantamweight title
15	Win	14–1	Sebastian Alejandro Castillo	MD	8	22 Jun 2023	Cirque Bormann, Paris, France	
14	Win	13–1	Gerson Larios	PTS	6	9 Jul 2022	Studio de la Victorine, Nice, France	
13	Loss	12–1	Loic Tajan	KO	2 (10)	4 Jun 2022	Zenith Metropole, Nantes, France	For vacant IBA Inter-continental bantamweight title
12	Win	12–0	Ricardo Blandon	UD	10	30 Oct 2021	Salle COSEC Pablo Neruda, Les Mureaux, France	Retained WBA Inter-continental bantamweight title
11	Win	11–0	Oleksandr Yegorov	UD	8	3 Apr 2021	Salle COSEC Pablo Neruda, Les Mureaux, France	
10	Win	10–0	Anuar Salas	UD	10	17 Oct 2020	Palais des sports Marcel-Cerdan, Levallois-Perret, France	Won WBA Inter-continental bantamweight title
9	Win	9–0	Sebastián Pérez	UD	12	13 Dec 2019	Palais des sports Marcel-Cerdan, Levallois-Perret, France	Won EBU European Union bantamweight title
8	Win	8–0	Loic Tajan	UD	10	28 Sep 2019	H Arena, Nantes, France	Retained French bantamweight title
7	Win	7–0	Sebastian Iacobas	UD	10	13 Jul 2019	Azur Arena Antibes, Antibes, France	Retained French bantamweight title
6	Win	6–0	Anthony Chapat	UD	10	9 Feb 2019	Dôme de Paris, Paris, France	Retained French bantamweight title
5	Win	5–0	Benedikt Croze	UD	10	30 Nov 2018	Gymnase Thévenet, Clermont-Ferrand, France	Won vacant French bantamweight title
4	Win	4–0	Pablo Narvaez	UD	6	7 Apr 2018	Dôme de Paris, Paris, France	
3	Win	3–0	Daniel Martins	UD	6	10 Mar 2018	La Seine Musicale, Boulogne-Billancourt, France	
2	Win	2–0	Mishiko Shubitidze	KO	1 (6)	16 Dec 2017	La Seine Musicale, Boulogne-Billancourt, France	
1	Win	1–0	Santiago San Eusebio	UD	6	14 Oct 2017	Zénith de Paris, Paris, France	
