= Elvin Mamishzada =

Azerbaijani boxer (born 1991)

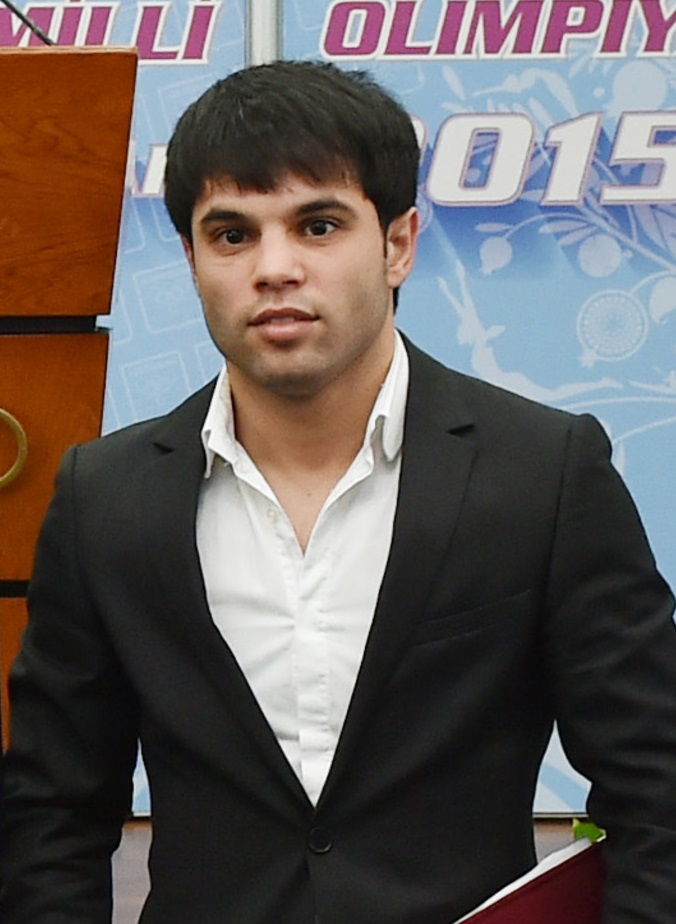

Personal information
- Full name: Elvin Rauf oglu Mamishzada
- Nationality: Azerbaijani
- Born: 17 December 1991 (age 34) Sumqayit, Azerbaijan
- Height: 1.60 m (5 ft 3 in)
- Weight: 52 kg (115 lb)

Sport
- Sport: Boxing
- Weight class: Flyweight
Medal record
Men's amateur boxing
Representing Azerbaijan
World Amateur Championships
Gold medal – first place	2015 Doha	Flyweight
European Games
Gold medal – first place	2015 Baku	Flyweight
European Amateur Championships
Silver medal – second place	2010 Moscow	Light Flyweight
Bronze medal – third place	2013 Minsk	Flyweight

Elvin Mamishzada (Azerbaijani: Elvin Məmişzadə, born 17 December 1991) is an Azerbaijani boxer. At the 2012 Summer Olympics, he competed in the men's flyweightevent, but was defeated in the first round by Nyambayaryn Tögstsogt of Mongolia. In the 2016 Summer Olympics, he lost in the quarter-final round against the eventual gold medalist, Shakhobidin Zoirov from Uzbekistan.

In 2015, he won the men's flyweight (-52 kg) gold in both the AIBA World Championships and the European Games.
