= Vincenzo Picardi =

Italian boxer (born 1983)

Personal information
- Born: October 20, 1983 (age 42)
- Height: 1.64 m (5 ft 5 in)

Sport
- Country: Italy
- Sport: Boxing
- Weight class: Flyweight
Medal record
Olympic Games
Bronze medal – third place	2008 Beijing	Flyweight
World Amateur Championships
Bronze medal – third place	2007 Chicago	Flyweight
EU Amateur Championships
Bronze medal – third place	2007 Dublin	Flyweight
European Amateur Championships
Bronze medal – third place	2010 Moscow	Flyweight
Bronze medal – third place	2011 Ankara	Flyweight

Vincenzo Picardi (born October 20, 1983, in Casoria) is an Italian professional boxer best known for winning bronze medals in the flyweight division at both the 2007 World Amateur Boxing Championships in Chicago and at the 2008 Olympics.

He failed to qualify for the 2004 Summer Olympics, finishing in third place at the 3rd AIBA European 2004 Olympic Qualifying Tournament in Gothenburg, Sweden.

At the 2006 European Championships he lost in the first round to favorite Samir Mammadov.

A year later at the 2007 World Championships he reached the semis, where he lost to Thai star Somjit Jongjohor (2:13).

At the Boxing at the 2008 Summer Olympics he again lost to Jongjohor.

At the 2009 Worlds in his own country he lost his first bout to a Mongolian.

He won the bronze medal at the 2010 European Amateur Boxing Championships in Moscow, Russia after he lost to Misha Aloyan from Russia in the Semis.

== Olympic games results ==
2008 (as a flyweight)

- Defeated Cassius Chiyanika (Zambia) 10-3
- Defeated Juan Carlos Payano (Dominican Republic) 8-4
- Defeated Walid Cherif (Tunisia) 7-5
- Lost to Somjit Jongjohor (Thailand) 1-7

2012 (as a flyweight)

- First round bye
- Lost to Tugstsogt Nyambayar (Mongolia) 16-17

== World amateur championships results ==
2005 (as a flyweight)

- Defeated Toshiyuki Igarashi (Japan) 29-9
- Lost to Samir Mammadov (Azberbaijan) 19-36

2007 (as a flyweight)

- Defeated Kadri Kordel (Turkey) 22-7
- Defeated Katsuaki Susa (Japan) 24-14
- Defeated Anuruddha Rathnayake (Sri Lanka) 23-4
- Lost to Somjit Jongjohor (Thailand) 2-13 (semifinal)
