= Muhammad Ali (British boxer) =

English boxer (born 1996)

Personal information
- Nationality: British
- Born: 20 June 1996 (age 30) Keighley, West Yorkshire, England
- Weight: Featherweight

Boxing career
- Stance: Orthodox

Boxing record
- Total fights: 6
- Wins: 5
- Win by KO: 0
- Losses: 0
- Draws: 1
Medal record
Men's amateur boxing
Representing England
Youth World Championships
Silver medal – second place	2014 Sofia	Flyweight

Muhammad Ali (born 20 June 1996) is an English professional boxer. As an amateur, he competed at the 2016 Summer Olympics, 2015 World Championships and the 2014 Youth World Championships where he won a silver medal.

== Amateur career ==
Ali won the 2015 Amateur Boxing Association British flyweight title, when boxing out of the Bury ABC.

== Failed drug test ==
In February 2018, Ali was banned from boxing for two years after traces of the anabolic steroid, Trenbolone were found in a urine sample whilst he was competing for the British Lionhearts in Casablanca, Morocco. Ali denied any wrongdoing, however his ban was upheld after he failed to provide enough evidence that he was not at fault.

== Professional career ==
On 22 February 2020, Ali made his professional debut against the experienced Bulgarian Stefan Sashev. Ali won the bout after referee, Lee Every, disqualified Sashev for persistent holding. Ali's second bout as a professional was against Jamie Quinn on 5 December 2020. Ali won via comfortable point decision after winning every round of the bout.

== Professional boxing record ==
6 fights	5 wins	0 losses
By knockout	0	0
By decision	4	0
By disqualification	1	0
Draws	1	

No.	Result	Record	Opponent	Type	Round, time	Date	Location	Notes
6	Draw	5–0–1	Miguel Zamora	PTS	6	22 Oct 2023	The Engine Shed, Wetherby, England	
5	Win	5–0	Rustem Fatkhullin	PTS	6	22 Jul 2023	Lightwaves Leisure Centre, Wakefield, England	
4	Win	4–0	Sandeep Singh Bhatti	PTS	6	11 Jun 2022	Telford International Centre, Telford, England	
3	Win	3–0	Lee Glover	PTS	6	10 Jul 2021	Royal Albert Hall, London, England	
2	Win	2–0	Jamie Quinn	PTS	6	5 Dec 2020	Church House, London, England	
1	Win	1–0	Stefan Sashev	DQ	2 (4), 1:39	22 Feb 2020	York Hall, London, England	Sashev disqualified for persistent holding
