= Hu Jianguan =

Chinese boxer (born 1993)

Personal information
- Born: 11 May 1993 (age 33) Wannian, Jiangxi, China
- Height: 168 cm (5 ft 6 in)
- Weight: 52 kg (115 lb)

Sport
- Sport: Boxing
Medal record
Men's amateur boxing
Representing China
Olympic Games
Bronze medal – third place	2016 Rio de Janeiro	Flyweight
World Championships
Bronze medal – third place	2015 Doha	Flyweight
Asian Championships
Bronze medal – third place	2019 Bangkok	Flyweight

Hu Jianguan (Chinese: 胡建关; pinyin: Hú Jiàn Guān; born 11 May 1993) is a Chinese boxer. He won the bronze medal in the men's 52 kg at the 2016 Olympics in Rio de Janeiro, Brazil.
