= Mohamed Flissi =

Algerian boxer (born 1990)

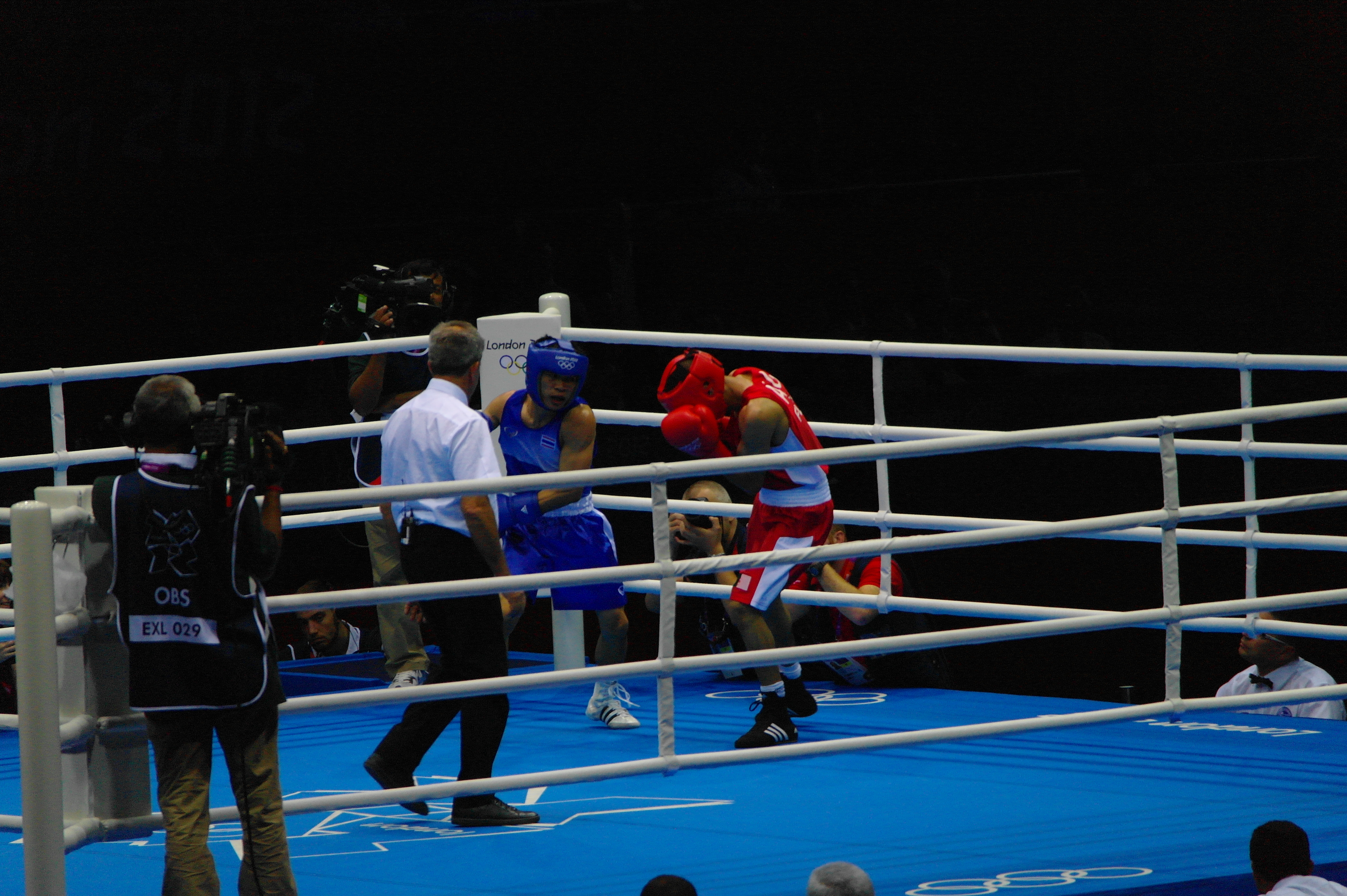
- Mohamed Flissi (ALG, red) vs Kaeo Pongprayoon (Thailand, blue) winner 11-19, here he goes for the KO.

Personal information
- Nationality: Algeria
- Born: 13 February 1990 (age 36) Boumerdès, Algeria
- Height: 1.63 m (5 ft 4 in)
- Weight: Light flyweight

Boxing career
Medal record
World Championships
Silver medal – second place	2013 Almaty	Light-Flyweight
Bronze medal – third place	2015 Doha	Flyweight
World Combat Games
Bronze medal – third place	2010 Beijing	Light flyweight
African Championships
Gold medal – first place	2015 Casablanca	Flyweight
Gold medal – first place	2017 Brazzaville	Flyweight
All-Africa Games
Gold medal – first place	2015 Brazzaville	Flyweight
Silver medal – second place	2011 Maputo	Light flyweight
Bronze medal – third place	2019 Rabat	Flyweight

Mohamed Flissi (born 13 February 1990) is an Algerian boxer. He represented Algeria at the 2012 Summer Olympics in London, United Kingdom and at the 2016 Summer Olympics in Rio de Janeiro, Brazil. He also qualified to represent Algeria at the 2020 Summer Olympics in Tokyo, Japan.

== Career ==
- (bronze) 2018 Beogradski Pobednik Belgrade, Serbia – 52 kg
- (gold) 2018 Arab Championships (Khartoum, Sudan )1st place – 52 kg
- 2017 Preliminaries 1/8 World Championships Hamburg, Germany – 52 kg
- (gold) 2017 African Championships Brazzaville, Congo 1st place – 52 kg
- 2016 Quarterfinals Olympic Games Rio de Janeiro, Brazil – 52 kg
- (gold) 2016 African Olympic Qualifier Yaounde, Cameroon 1st place – 52 kg
- (silver) 2016 Duisenkul Shopokov Bishkek, Kyrgyzstan 2nd place – 52 kg
- (bronze) 2015 World Championships Doha, Qatar 3rd place – 52 kg
- (gold) 2015 All Africa Games (Brazzaville, CGO) 1st place – 52 kg
- (gold) 2015 African Amateur Boxing Championships (Casablanca, MAR) 1st place – 52 kg
- (gold) 2014 – African Cup of Nations (East London, RSA) 1st place – 52 kg
- (gold) 2014 – Algerian National Championships 1st place – 49 kg W
- (silver) 2013 AIBA World Boxing Championships (Almaty, KAZ) 2nd place – 49 kg
- (gold) 2013 Mediterranean Games (Mersin, TUR) 1st place – 49 kg
- (bronze) 2013 – Giraldo Cordova Cardin Memorial Tournament (Havana, CUB) 3rd place – 49 kg
- (gold) 2013 – Limassol Boxing Tournament (Limassol, CYP) 1st place – 49 kg
- (gold) 2013 – Setif International Tournament (Setif, ALG) 1st place – 49 kg
- (gold) 2013 – Algerian National Cup 1st place – 49 kg
- 2012 – London 2012 Olympic Games (London, GBR) participant – 49 kg
- (gold) 2012 – AIBA African Olympic Qualification Tournament (Casablanca, MAR) 1st place – 49 kg
- (gold) 2012 – Algerian National Federal Cup 1st place – 49 kg
- 2011 AIBA World Boxing Championships (Baku, AZE) participant – 49 kg
- (silver) 2011 All-Africa Games (Maputo, MOZ) 2nd place – 49
- (silver) 2011 – Arab Championships (Doha, QAT) 2nd place – 49 kg
- (gold) 2011 – Algerian National Federation Cup 1st place – 49 kg
- (bronze) 2010 World Combat Games (Beijing, CHN) 3rd place – 49 kg

== World Series of Boxing record ==
6 fights	3 wins	3 losses
By knockout	0	1
By decision	3	2

No.	Result	Record	Team	Opponent (Team)	Type	Round, time	Date	Location	Notes
6	Win	3–3	Algeria Desert Hawks	(Republic of Ireland) Paddy Barnes (Italia Thunder)	SD	5	12 Mar 2014	Algiers, Algeria	
5	Loss	2–3	Algeria Desert Hawks	(Puerto Rico) Anthony Chacón (USA Knockouts)	TKO	2 on 0:44	7 Feb 2014	Miami, United States	
4	Win	2–2	Algeria Desert Hawks	Sergej Neumann (Team Germany)	UD	5	18 Jan 2014	Blida, Algeria	
3	Loss	1–2	Algeria Desert Hawks	Dawid Michelus (Hussars of Poland)	SD	5	24 Feb 2013	Blida, Algeria	
2	Win	1–1	Algeria Desert Hawks	Cristian Jesus Torres (Mexico Guerreros)	UD	5	8 Feb 2013	Blida, Algeria	
1	Loss	0–1	Algeria Desert Hawks	Mateusz Mazik (Hussars of Poland)	UD	5	14 Dec 2012	Warsaw, Poland	WSB debut

Olympic Games
Preceded by Sonia Asselah	Flag bearer for Algeria; 2020 Tokyo with Amel Melih	Succeeded by Yasser Triki; Amina Belkadi
