= Billal Bennama =

French boxer (born 1998)

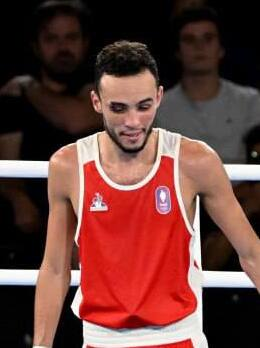
- Bennama at the 2024 Olympics

Personal information
- Nationality: French
- Born: 14 June 1998 (age 28) Blagnac, France
- Height: 1.75 m (5 ft 9 in)

Boxing career

Boxing record
- Total fights: 34
- Wins: 22
- Win by KO: 1
- Losses: 12
- Draws: 0
- No contests: 0
Medal record
Men's amateur boxing
Representing France
Olympic Games
Silver medal – second place	2024 Paris	Flyweight
World Championships
Silver medal – second place	2023 Tashkent	Flyweight
Bronze medal – third place	2019 Yekaterinburg	Flyweight
Bronze medal – third place	2021 Belgrade	Bantamweight
European Games
Gold medal – first place	2023 Kraków-Małopolska	Flyweight
European Championships
Gold medal – first place	2022 Yerevan	Bantamweight
Silver medal – second place	2024 Belgrade	Bantamweight

Billal Bennama (born 14 June 1998) is a French boxer.

== Career ==
He won a medal at the 2019 AIBA World Boxing Championships.

== Personal life ==
Born in France, he is of Algerian descent.
