= Mikhail Aloyan =

Russian boxer (born 1988)

Mikhail Aloyan Михаил Алоян
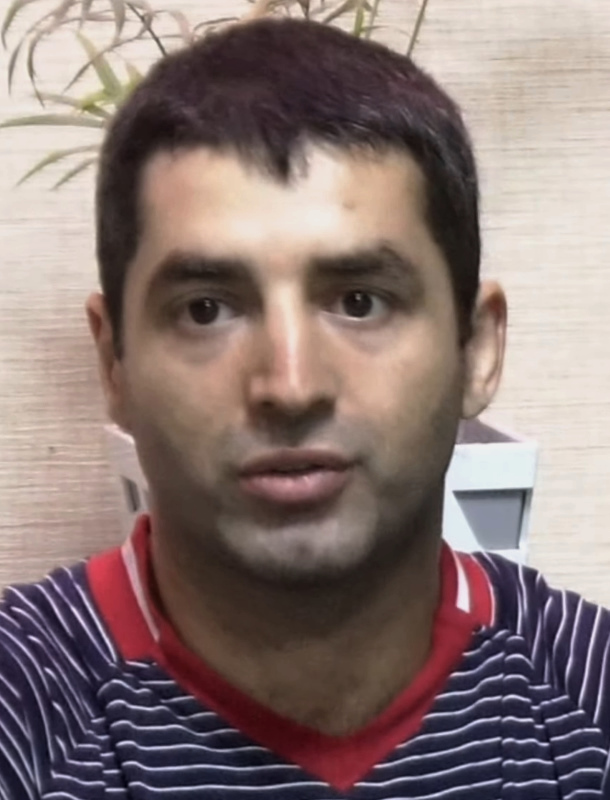
- Aloyan in 2020

Personal information
- Nationality: Kurdish
- Born: Misha Aloyan; 23 August 1988 (age 38) Bambakashat, Armenian SSR, Soviet Union
- Height: 5 ft 4 1/2 in (164 cm)
- Weight: Super-flyweight; Bantamweight

Boxing career
- Stance: Southpaw

Boxing record
- Total fights: 9
- Wins: 8
- Win by KO: 1
- Losses: 1
Medal record
Men's amateur boxing
Representing Russia
Olympic Games
Bronze medal – third place	2012 London	Flyweight
World Championships
Bronze medal – third place	2009 Milan	Flyweight
Gold medal – first place	2011 Baku	Flyweight
Gold medal – first place	2013 Almaty	Flyweight
European Championships
Gold medal – first place	2010 Moscow	Flyweight
World Cup
Gold medal – first place	2008 Moscow	Flyweight
Summer Universiade
Silver medal – second place	2013 Kazan	Flyweight

Mikhail Surenovich Aloyan (Russian: Михаил Суренович Алоян; born 23 August 1988) is a Russian professional boxer of Kurdish origin, who challenged for the WBO bantamweight title in 2018. As an amateur flyweight, Aloyan won gold medals at the 2010 European Championships, the 2011 and 2013 World Championships, and bronze at the 2009 World Championships and the 2012 Olympics.

== Early life ==
Aloyan was born on 23 August 1988 in the village of Bambakashat, Armenian SSR, Soviet Union (now Armavir Province, Armenia) to a Kurds–Yazidi family. In 1997, his family moved to Novokuznetsk, Russia. He later moved to Novosibirsk.

== Amateur career ==
At Moscow 2010, he beat Nordine Oubaali, Vincenzo Picardi and Khalid Saeed Yafai to win the European Championships.

At Baku 2011, he added a World title by defeating Rau'shee Warren and edging Welshman Andrew Selby 13–12.

At the 2012 Summer Olympics, he beat Samir Brahimi and Jeyvier Cintron before losing to Nyambayaryn Tögstsogt in the semifinal. He won another medal four years later in Rio 2016, a silver.

On 8 December 2016, he was stripped of the silver medal in 52 kg boxing won at the Rio 2016 Summer Olympics after testing positive for tuaminoheptane.

== Professional boxing career ==
Aloyan made his professional debut against Yader Cardoza on 11 May 2017, in a fight for the vacant WBA East Asia super-flyweight title. He won the fight by unanimous decision. Aloyan next faced Marvin Solano for the vacant WBC Silver super-flyweight title on 22 July 2017, and won the fight by unanimous decision. Five months later, on 9 December 2017, Aloyan was scheduled to face Hermogenes Elizabeth Castillo for the vacant WBA International bantamweight title. He won the fight by split decision. Aloyan made his first, and only, WBA International title defense against Alexander Espinoza on 3 February 2018, and won the fight by split decision.

=== Aloyan vs. Tete ===
Aloyan participated in the 2018 World Boxing Super Series bantamweight tournament. He was scheduled to face the WBO World bantamweight champion Zolani Tete in the tournament quarterfinals, on 13 October 2018. Tete won the fight by unanimous decision, with scores of 114-111, 114-111 and 114-110. Both fighters were deducted a point for excessive holding, Tete in the eleventh and Aloyan in the twelfth round.

=== Aloyan vs. Batista ===
Aloyan was scheduled to face Ronal Batista for the inaugural WBA Gold super-flyweight title on 10 December 2019. Batista was ranked #14 by the WBA at super flyweight. He won the fight by unanimous decision.

=== Aloyan vs. Hryshchuk ===
He made his first WBA Gold title defense against Oleksandr Hryshchuk on 4 June 2021. Hryshchuk retired from the bout at the end of the eight round.

=== Aloyan vs. Yohana ===
Aloyan faced Mchanja Yohana on 22 July 2021. He won the fight by unanimous decision, with all three judges awarding him a 99-91 scorecard.

On 30 January 2022, Aloyan held a press conference, during which he announced he would retire after his next fight.

=== Aloyan vs. Barreto ===
On 8 February, it was announced that Aloyan would face David Barreto in his farewell fight, on 21 February 2022. Aloyan won the fight by majority decision.

== Personal life ==
Aloyan married his wife Greta, a third-year student of the Faculty of Dentistry at Novosibirsk State Medical University, on 15 October 2011. The ceremony took place at the Novosibirsk Wedding Palace.

In 2012, he officially changed his first name Misha to Mikhail.

== Professional boxing record ==
9 fights	8 wins	1 loss
By knockout	1	0
By decision	7	1

No.	Result	Record	Opponent	Type	Round, time	Date	Location	Notes
9	Win	8–1	(Venezuela) David Barreto	MD	10	22 Feb 2022	USC Soviet Wings, Moscow, Russia	Won vacant WBA Gold super-flyweight title
8	Win	7–1	(Tanzania) Mchanja Yohana	UD	10	22 Jul 2021	Dynamo Volleyball Arena, Moscow, Russia	
7	Win	6–1	(Ukraine) Oleksandr Hryshchuk	RTD	8 (12), 3:00	4 Jun 2021	Sibur Arena, Saint Petersburg, Russia	Retained WBA Gold super-flyweight title
6	Win	5–1	(Panama) Ronal Batista	UD	12	10 Dec 2019	Kemerovo Arena, Kemerovo, Russia	Won inaugural WBA Gold super-flyweight title
5	Loss	4–1	(South Africa) Zolani Tete	UD	12	13 Oct 2018	Expo Center, Yekaterinburg, Russia	For WBO bantamweight title; World Boxing Super Series: bantamweight quarter-final
4	Win	4–0	(Nicaragua) Alexander Espinoza	SD	10	3 Feb 2018	Bolshoy Ice Dome, Sochi, Russia	Retained WBA International bantamweight title
3	Win	3–0	(Nicaragua) Hermogenes Elizabeth Castillo	SD	10	9 Dec 2017	Kemerovo Arena, Kemerovo, Russia	Won vacant WBA International bantamweight title
2	Win	2–0	(Nicaragua) Marvin Solano	UD	12	22 Jul 2017	Red Square, Moscow, Russia	Won vacant WBC Silver super-flyweight title
1	Win	1–0	(Nicaragua) Yader Cardoza	UD	10	11 May 2017	Kemerovo Arena, Kemerovo, Russia	Won vacant WBA East Asia super-flyweight title

== Views ==
On 4 March 2022, on Instagram, Aloyan published a video in which he expressed support for Russian Paralympians, as well as for Vladimir Putin and the Russian special military operation against Ukraine.

Sporting positions
Regional boxing titles
New title	WBA East Asia super-flyweight champion 11 May 2017 – September 2017; Vacated	Vacant
Vacant Title last held by Srisaket Sor Rungvisai	WBC Silver super-flyweight champion 22 July 2017 – November 2017; Vacated	Vacant Title next held by McWilliams Arroyo
Vacant Title last held by Mzuvukile Magwaca	WBA International bantamweight champion 3 February 2018 – October 2018	Vacant Title next held by Joshua Franco
