= Daniel Asenov =

Bulgarian boxer (born 1997)

Personal information
- Born: 17 May 1997 (age 29) Kukorevo, Yambol Province, Bulgaria

Sport
- Sport: Boxing
Medal record
Men's amateur boxing
Representing Bulgaria
European Games
Silver medal – second place	2019 Minsk	Flyweight
European Championships
Gold medal – first place	2015 Samokov	Flyweight
Gold medal – first place	2017 Kharkiv	Flyweight
Bronze medal – third place	2022 Yerevan	Bantamweight

Daniel Asenov (Bulgarian: Даниел Асенов, born 17 May 1997) is a Bulgarian boxer. He competed in the men's flyweight event at the 2016 Summer Olympics, where he reached the round of 16.
