= 2009 World Amateur Boxing Championships – Light flyweight =

Boxing competitions

The Light flyweight competition was the lightest class featured at the 2009 World Amateur Boxing Championships, and was held at the Mediolanum Forum. Flyweights were limited to a maximum of 48 kilograms in body mass.

== Medalists ==
Gold	Pürevdorjiin Serdamba; Mongolia
Silver	David Ayrapetyan; Russia
Bronze	Li Jiazhao; China
Bronze	Shin Jong-Hun; South Korea

== Seeds ==
1. (Poland) Łukasz Maszczyk (quarterfinals)
2. (India) Nanao Singh Thokchom (second round)
3. (Republic of Ireland) Patrick Barnes (second round)
4. (Brazil) Paulo Carvaho (third round)
5. (Armenia) Hovhannes Danielyan (quarterfinals)
6. (Morocco) Redouane Bouchtouk (third round)
7. (Spain) José Kelvin de la Nieve Linares (quarterfinals)
8. (Turkey) Ferhat Pehlivan (second round)

== Draw ==
=== Finals ===
Quarterfinals
Łukasz Maszczyk (POL)
Li Jiazhao (CHN)	RSCI
Hovhannes Danielyan (ARM)	4
Pürevdorjiin Serdamba (MGL)	6
Daniel Matellon Ramos (CUB)	5
Shin Jong Hun (KOR)	14
David Ayrapetyan (RUS)	12
Jose de la Nieve Linares (ESP)	3

Semifinals
Li Jiazhao (CHN)	7
Pürevdorjiin Serdamba (MGL)	11
Shin Jong Hun (KOR)	1
David Ayrapetyan (RUS)	9

Final
Pürevdorjiin Serdamba (MGL)	10
David Ayrapetyan (RUS)	5

=== Top Half ===
==== Section 1 ====
Round 1

Round 2
Łukasz Maszczyk (POL)	21
Mohammad Aref (AFG)	6
Lony Pierre (HAI)	2
Bathusi Mogajane (BOT)	13
Felix Alvarado Sanchez (NCA)	3
Li Jiazhao (CHN)	21
Denys Shkarubo (UKR)	0
Redouane Bouchtouk (MAR)	21

Round 3
Łukasz Maszczyk (POL)	13
Bathusi Mogajane (BOT)	7
Li Jiazhao (CHN)	11
Redouane Bouchtouk (MAR)	5

Quarterfinals
Łukasz Maszczyk (POL)
Li Jiazhao (CHN)	RSCI

==== Section 2 ====
Round 1

Round 2
Hovhannes Danielyan (ARM)	11
Harry Tañamor (PHI)	3
Lebogang Pilane (RSA)	13
Lui Magaiva (PNG)	4
Pürevdorjiin Serdamba (MGL)	10
Miroslav Kovacs (SVK)	3
Jhon Corona Azama (ESA)	13
Paulo Carvaho (BRA)	18

Round 3
Hovhannes Danielyan (ARM)	12
Lebogang Pilane (RSA)	3
Pürevdorjiin Serdamba (MGL)	15
Paulo Carvaho (BRA)	7

Quarterfinals
Hovhannes Danielyan (ARM)	4
Pürevdorjiin Serdamba (MGL)	6

=== Bottom Half ===
==== Section 3 ====
Round 1

Round 2
Patrick Barnes (IRL)	4
Peter Mungai (KEN)	15
Daniel Matellon Ramos (CUB)	RSCH
Rashid Fateh (PAK)
Ronald Serugo (UGA)	11
Thomas Stubbs (ENG)	2
Shin Jong Hun (KOR)	9
Lu Chia Lun (TPE)	1

Round 3
Peter Mungai (KEN)	2
Daniel Matellon Ramos (CUB)	9
Ronald Serugo (UGA)	3
Shin Jong Hun (KOR)	17

Quarterfinals
Daniel Matellon Ramos (CUB)	5
Shin Jong Hun (KOR)	14

==== Section 4 ====
Round 1
Raymond Randrianjanaka (MAD)	6
Alisher Mahmudov (UZB)	26
Carlos Quipo (ECU)	13
Sikham Vongpakhoun (LAO)	5
Ceiber Avila Segura (COL)	6
David Ayrapetyan (RUS)	25
Aleksan Chechelyan (GEO)	2
Ferhat Pehlivan (TUR)	11
Jose de la Nieve Linares (ESP)	13
Istvan Ungvari (HUN)	1
Taro Hayashida (JPN)	9
Miguel Cartagena (USA)	23
Adlet Kapezov (KAZ)	4
Kaeo Pongprayoon (THA)	14
Elvin Mamishzade (AZE)	6
Nanao Thokchom (IND)	21

Round 2
Alisher Mahmudov (UZB)	9
Carlos Quipo (ECU)	20
David Ayrapetyan (RUS)	7
Ferhat Pehlivan (TUR)	2
Jose de la Nieve Linares (ESP)	19
Miguel Cartagena (USA)	7
Kaeo Pongprayoon (THA)	16
Nanao Thokchom (IND)	4

Round 3
Carlos Quipo (ECU)	5
David Ayrapetyan (RUS)	14
Jose de la Nieve Linares (ESP)	9
Kaeo Pongprayoon (THA)	3

Quarterfinals
David Ayrapetyan (RUS)	12
Jose de la Nieve Linares (ESP)	3

== See also ==
- Boxing at the 2008 Summer Olympics – Light flyweight
