= 2011 World Amateur Boxing Championships – Light flyweight =

Boxing competitions

The Light flyweight competition was the lightest class featured at the 2011 World Amateur Boxing Championships, held at the Heydar Aliyev Sports and Exhibition Complex. Boxers were limited to a maximum of 49 kilograms (108 lb) in body mass.

== Medalists ==
Gold	Zou Shiming (CHN)
Silver	Shin Jong-Hun (KOR)
Bronze	David Ayrapetyan (RUS)
Bronze	Pürevdorjiin Serdamba (MGL)

== Seeds ==
1. (Azerbaijan) Salman Alizade (third round)
2. (South Korea) Shin Jong-Hun (runner-up)
3. (Mongolia) Pürevdorjiin Serdamba (semifinals)
4. (Russia) David Ayrapetyan (semifinals)
5. (Spain) José de la Nieve (quarterfinals)
6. (Armenia) Hovhannes Danielyan (second round)
7. (Ecuador) Carlos Quipo (third round)
8. (Republic of Ireland) Paddy Barnes (second round)

== Draw ==
=== Finals ===
Semifinals
1	Zou Shiming (CHN)	15
4	David Ayrapetyan (RUS)	8
3	Pürevdorjiin Serdamba (MGL)	11
2	Shin Jong-Hun (KOR)	20

Final
Zou Shiming (CHN)	20
Shin Jong-Hun (KOR)	11

=== Top half ===
==== Section 1 ====
Round 1
Abdeali Daraa (MAR)	16
Denys Kozaruk (UKR)	7
Hamza Touba (GER)	14
Muhamad Mohd (MAS)	8
Juan Medina (DOM)	9
Zou Shiming (CHN)	17
Mark Barriga (PHI)	12
Stefan Caslarov (ROU)	5

Round 2
Salman Alizade (AZE)	16
Abdeali Daraa (MAR)	12
Hamza Touba (GER)	8
Kaew Pongprayoon (THA)	14
Istvan Ungvari (HUN)	2
Zou Shiming (CHN)	12
Mark Barriga (PHI)	20
Paddy Barnes (IRL)	12

Round 3
Salman Alizade (AZE)	8
Kaew Pongprayoon (THA)	23
Zou Shiming (CHN)	12
Mark Barriga (PHI)	5

Quarterfinals
Kaew Pongprayoon (THA)	8
Zou Shiming (CHN)	14

==== Section 2 ====
Round 1
Alvaro Vargas (GUA)	11
Ramy Helmy El-Awadi (EGY)	16
Avtandil Tchubabria (GEO)	9
Vadzim Kirylenka (BLR)	7
Fahad Al-Faifi (KSA)	6
Łukasz Maszczyk (POL)	23
Eros Correa (USA)	14
Jason Lavigilante (MRI)	11

Round 2
José de la Nieve (ESP)	18
Ramy Helmy El-Awadi (EGY)	12
Avtandil Tchubabria (GEO)	8
Alex Ferramosca (ITA)	15
Farhad Sharifi (AFG)	14
Łukasz Maszczyk (POL)	28
Eros Correa (USA)	10
David Ayrapetyan (RUS)	23

Round 3
José de la Nieve (ESP)	18
Alex Ferramosca (ITA)	17
Łukasz Maszczyk (POL)	7
David Ayrapetyan (RUS)	24

Quarterfinals
José de la Nieve (ESP)	8
David Ayrapetyan (RUS)	15

=== Bottom half ===
==== Section 3 ====
Round 1
Mohamed Flissi (ALG)	8
Thomas Essomba (CMR)	17
Junior Zarate (ARG)	17
Charlie Edwards (ENG)	15
Yosvany Veitia (CUB)	21
Birzhan Zhakypov (KAZ)	11
Denisius Hitarihun (INA)	7
Naoya Inoue (JPN)	16

Round 2
Pürevdorjiin Serdamba (MGL)	11
Thomas Essomba (CMR)	6
Junior Zarate (ARG)	13
Ceiber Avila (COL)	14
Georgi Andonov (BUL)	5
Yosvany Veitia (CUB)	19
Naoya Inoue (JPN)	RSC
Hovhannes Danielyan (ARM)

Round 3
Pürevdorjiin Serdamba (MGL)	13
Ceiber Avila (COL)	12
Yosvany Veitia (CUB)	15
Naoya Inoue (JPN)	12

Quarterfinals
Pürevdorjiin Serdamba (MGL)	RSC
Yosvany Veitia (CUB)

==== Section 4 ====
Round 1
Eduard Bermúdez (VEN)	9
Ferhat Pehlivan (TUR)	+9
Asylbek Nazaraliev (KGZ)	8
Devendro Singh (IND)	14
Lebogang Pilane (RSA)	9
Jérémy Beccu (FRA)	21
Jhon Corona (ESA)	6
Ronald Serugo (UGA)	15

Round 2
Carlos Quipo (ECU)	17
Ferhat Pehlivan (TUR)	10
Devendro Singh (IND)	40
Joselito Velázquez (MEX)	19
Shakhobidin Zoirov (UZB)	19
Jérémy Beccu (FRA)	21
Ronald Serugo (UGA)	14
Shin Jong-Hun (KOR)	22

Round 3
Carlos Quipo (ECU)	12
Devendro Singh (IND)	18
Jérémy Beccu (FRA)	10
Shin Jong-Hun (KOR)	22

Quarterfinals
Devendro Singh (IND)	16
Shin Jong-Hun (KOR)	28
