= Boxing at the 2012 Summer Olympics – Men's light flyweight =

Boxing competitions

Men's light flyweight boxing at the Games of the XXX Olympiad
- Venue: ExCeL Exhibition Centre
- Date: 31 July to 12 August 2012
- Competitors: 26 from 26 nations

Medalists
1st place, gold medalist(s)		Zou Shiming	China
2nd place, silver medalist(s)		Kaeo Pongprayoon	Thailand
3rd place, bronze medalist(s)		Paddy Barnes	Ireland
3rd place, bronze medalist(s)		David Ayrapetyan	Russia

The men's light flyweight boxing competition at the 2012 Olympic Games in London was held from 31 July to 12 August at the ExCeL Exhibition Centre.

== Competition format ==
Like all Olympic boxing events, the competition was a straight single-elimination tournament. This event consisted of 26 boxers who have qualified for the competition through various qualifying tournaments held in 2011 and 2012. The competition began with a preliminary round on 31 July, where the number of competitors was reduced to 16, and concluded with the final on 11 August. As there were fewer than 32 boxers in the competition, a number of boxers received a bye through the preliminary round. Both semi-final losers were awarded bronze medals.

All bouts consisted of three three-minute rounds. The boxers receive points for every successful punch they land on their opponent's head or upper body. The boxer with the most points at the end of the bouts wins. If a boxer is knocked to the ground and cannot get up before the referee counts to 10 then the bout is over and the opponent wins.

== Schedule ==
All times are British Summer Time (UTC+1)

Date	Time	Round
Tuesday 31 July 2012	13:30 & 20:30	Round of 32
Saturday 4 August 2012	13:30 & 20:30	Round of 16
Wednesday 8 August 2012	20:30	Quarter-finals
Friday 10 August 2012	13:30	Semi-finals
Saturday 11 August 2012	20:30	Final

== Results ==
=== Finals ===
Semi-finals
Zou Shiming (CHN)	15
Paddy Barnes (IRL)	15
David Ayrapetyan (RUS)	12
Kaeo Pongprayoon (THA)	13

Final
Zou Shiming (CHN)	13
Kaeo Pongprayoon (THA)	10

=== Top half ===
Round of 32
Billy Ward (AUS)	4
Yosbany Veitia (CUB)	26
Mark Barriga (PHI)	17
Manuel Cappai (ITA)	7
Birzhan Zhakypov (KAZ)	18
Jérémy Beccu (FRA)	17
Thomas Essomba (CMR)	13
Abdelali Daraa (MAR)	10
Devendro Singh (IND)	RSC
Bayron Molina (HON)

Round of 16
Zou Shiming (CHN)	14
Yosbany Veitia (CUB)	11
Mark Barriga (PHI)	16
Birzhan Zhakypov (KAZ)	17
Paddy Barnes (IRL)	15
Thomas Essomba (CMR)	10
Devendro Singh (IND)	16
Pürevdorjiin Serdamba (MGL)	11

Quarter-finals
Zou Shiming (CHN)	13
Birzhan Zhakypov (KAZ)	10
Paddy Barnes (IRL)	23
Devendro Singh (IND)	18

Semi-finals
Zou Shiming (CHN)	15
Paddy Barnes (IRL)	15

=== Bottom half ===
Round of 32
Jantony Ortíz (PUR)	20
Tetteh Sulemanu (GHA)	6
Ferhat Pehlivan (TUR)	16
Carlos Suárez (TRI)	6
José Kelvin de la Nieve (ESP)	11
Carlos Quipo (ECU)	14
Mohamed Flissi (ALG)	11
Kaeo Pongprayoon (THA)	19
Aleksandar Aleksandrov (BUL)	22
Juliano Máquina (MOZ)	7

Round of 16
David Ayrapetyan (RUS)	15
Jantony Ortíz (PUR)	13
Ferhat Pehlivan (TUR)	20
Ramy El-Awadi (EGY)	6
Carlos Quipo (ECU)	6
Kaeo Pongprayoon (THA)	10
Aleksandar Aleksandrov (BUL)	15
Shin Jong-hun (KOR)	14

Quarter-finals
David Ayrapetyan (RUS)	19
Ferhat Pehlivan (TUR)	11
Kaeo Pongprayoon (THA)	16
Aleksandar Aleksandrov (BUL)	10

Semi-finals
David Ayrapetyan (RUS)	12
Kaeo Pongprayoon (THA)	13
