= Thailand at the 2012 Summer Olympics =

- IOC code: THA
- NOC: National Olympic Committee of Thailand
- Website: www.olympicthai.or.th (in Thai and English)

in London
- Competitors: 37 in 15 sports
- Flag bearers: Nuttapong Ketin (opening); Kaeo Pongprayoon (closing)
- Medals Ranked 57th: Gold 0 Silver 2 Bronze 2 Total 4

Summer Olympics appearances (overview)
- 1952; 1956; 1960; 1964; 1968; 1972; 1976; 1980; 1984; 1988; 1992; 1996; 2000; 2004; 2008; 2012; 2016; 2020; 2024

Thailand competed at the 2012 Summer Olympics in London, from 27 July to 12 August 2012. This was the nation's fifteenth appearance at the Olympics, except the 1980 Summer Olympics in Moscow because of its support for the United States boycott.

The National Olympic Committee of Thailand sent the nation's smallest delegation to the Games since 1996. A total of 37 athletes, 19 men and 18 women, competed in 15 sports. Among the sports played by the athletes, Thailand marked its Olympic debut in slalom canoeing, and also, its Olympic return in archery and rowing after an eight-year absence. Four athletes received their spots in athletics and swimming by wild card entries, while the other Thai athletes won their spots by participating in various qualifying matches around the world. Four Thai athletes made their fourth Olympic appearance: pistol shooter Jakkrit Panichpatikum (the oldest athlete of the team, at age 39), badminton players Boonsak Ponsana and Saralee Thoungthongkam, and table tennis player Nanthana Komwong. Breaststroke and medley swimmer Nuttapong Ketin, the youngest male athlete of the team, was the nation's flag bearer at the opening ceremony.

Thailand, however, failed to win an Olympic gold medal for the first time since 1992, but left London with only two silver and two bronze. Taekwondo jin Chanatip Sonkham managed to repeat the nation's Olympic medal by taking the bronze in women's flyweight division. Other medals were awarded to the athletes in weightlifting, and in boxing, won by Kaeo Pongprayoon from the men's light-flyweight division.

== Medalists ==
Medal	Name	Sport	Event	Date
Silver	Pimsiri Sirikaew	Weightlifting	Women's 58 kg	30 July
Silver	Kaeo Pongprayoon	Boxing	Men's light flyweight	11 August
Bronze	Rattikan Gulnoi	Weightlifting	Women's 58 kg	30 July
Bronze	Chanatip Sonkham	Taekwondo	Women's 49 kg	8 August

== Archery ==
Thailand has qualified one male archer.

Athlete	Event	Ranking round		Round of 32	Round of 16	Quarterfinals	Semifinals	Final / BM	
Athlete	Event	Score	Seed	Opposition Score	Opposition Score	Opposition Score	Opposition Score	Opposition Score	Rank
Witthaya Thamwong	Men's individual	662	38	Faucheron (FRA) (27); L 0–6	Did not advance				

== Athletics ==
Thai athletes have so far achieved qualifying standards in the following athletics events (up to a maximum of 3 athletes in each event at the 'A' Standard, and 1 at the 'B' Standard):

Key

- Note – Ranks given for track events are within the athlete's heat only
- Q = Qualified for the next round
- q = Qualified for the next round as a fastest loser or, in field events, by position without achieving the qualifying target
- NR = National record
- N/A = Round not applicable for the event
- Bye = Athlete not required to compete in round

Men

Athlete	Event	Qualification		Final	
Athlete	Event	Distance	Position	Distance	Position
Supanara Sukhasvasti	Long jump	7.38	33	Did not advance	

Women

Athlete	Event	Qualification		Final	
Athlete	Event	Distance	Position	Distance	Position
Wanida Boonwan	High jump	1.80	29	Did not advance	

== Badminton ==
Athlete	Event	Group Stage				Elimination	Quarterfinal	Semifinal	Final / BM	
Athlete	Event	Opposition Score	Opposition Score	Opposition Score	Rank	Opposition Score	Opposition Score	Opposition Score	Opposition Score	Rank
Boonsak Ponsana	Men's singles	Chen L (CHN); L 12–21, 17–21	—		2	Did not advance				
Bodin Isara; Maneepong Jongjit	Men's doubles	Ko S-h / Yoo Y-s (KOR); W 21–15, 21–14	Cwalina / Łogosz (POL); W 21–0, 21–0	Ahsan / Septano (INA); W 21–11, 21–16	1 Q	—	Koo K K / Tan B H (MAS); L 16–21, 18–21	Did not advance		
Ratchanok Inthanon	Women's singles	Santos (POR); W 21–12, 21–6	Jayasinghe (SRI); W 21–13, 21–5	—	1 Q	Schenk (GER); W 21–16, 21–15	Wang X (CHN); L 21–17, 18–21, 14–21	Did not advance		
Sudket Prapakamol; Saralee Thoungthongkam	Mixed doubles	Xu C / Ma J (CHN); L 19–21, 12–21	Chan P S / Goh L Y (MAS); W 21–1, 21–15	Chen H-l / Cheng W-h (TPE); W 21–15, 21–16	2 Q	—	Nielsen / Pedersen (DEN); L 15–21, 13–21	Did not advance		

== Boxing ==
Thailand has already qualified 3 boxers at the 2012 Summer Olympics.

Men

Athlete	Event	Round of 32	Round of 16	Quarterfinals	Semifinals	Final	
Athlete	Event	Opposition Result	Opposition Result	Opposition Result	Opposition Result	Opposition Result	Rank
Kaeo Pongprayoon	Light flyweight	Flissi (ALG); W 19–11	Quipo (ECU); W 10–6	Aleksandrov (BUL); W 16–10	Ayrapetyan (RUS); W 13–12	Zou S (CHN); L 10–13	2nd place, silver medalist(s)
Chatchai Butdee	Flyweight	Eker (TUR); W 24–10	Ramírez (CUB); L 10–22	Did not advance			
Sailom Adi	Lightweight	Zhailauov (KAZ); L 12–12^{+}	Did not advance				

== Canoeing ==
=== Slalom ===
Athlete	Event	Preliminary						Semifinal		Final	
Athlete	Event	Run 1	Rank	Run 2	Rank	Best	Rank	Time	Rank	Time	Rank
Hermann Husslein	Men's K-1	100.67	19	95.11	17	95.11	19	Did not advance			

== Cycling ==
=== Road ===
Athlete	Event	Time	Rank
Jutatip Maneephan	Women's road race	Did not finish	

== Equestrian ==
=== Eventing ===
Athlete	Horse	Event	Dressage		Cross-country			Jumping						Total	
Athlete	Horse	Event	Dressage		Cross-country			Qualifier			Final			Total	
Athlete	Horse	Event	Penalties	Rank	Penalties	Total	Rank	Penalties	Total	Rank	Penalties	Total	Rank	Penalties	Rank
Nina Ligon	Butts Leon	Individual	53.90	29	16.00	69.90	22	22.00	91.90	41	Did not advance			91.90	41

== Judo ==
Thailand has qualified 1 judoka

Athlete	Event	Round of 32	Round of 16	Quarterfinals	Semifinals	Repechage	Final / BM	
Athlete	Event	Opposition Result	Opposition Result	Opposition Result	Opposition Result	Opposition Result	Opposition Result	Rank
Teerawat Homklin	Men's −100 kg	Naidangiin (MGL); L 0000–1000	Did not advance					

== Rowing ==
Thailand has qualified the following boats.

Women

Athlete	Event	Heats		Repechage		Quarterfinals		Semifinals		Final	
Athlete	Event	Time	Rank	Time	Rank	Time	Rank	Time	Rank	Time	Rank
Phuttharaksa Neegree	Single sculls	7:52.62	4 QF	Bye		8:16.50	6 SC/D	8:03.91	3 FC	8:34.11	17

Qualification Legend: FA=Final A (medal); FB=Final B (non-medal); FC=Final C (non-medal); FD=Final D (non-medal); FE=Final E (non-medal); FF=Final F (non-medal); SA/B=Semifinals A/B; SC/D=Semifinals C/D; SE/F=Semifinals E/F; QF=Quarterfinals; R=Repechage

== Sailing ==
Thailand has qualified 1 boat for each of the following events

Men

Athlete	Event	Race											Net points	Final rank
Athlete	Event	1	2	3	4	5	6	7	8	9	10	M*	Net points	Final rank
Ek Boonsawad	RS:X	28	32	27	26	21	32	31	23	~~DNF~~	34	EL	254	33
Keerati Bualong	Laser	47	48	47	42	44	45	~~DSQ~~	37	47	47	EL	404	48

Women

Athlete	Event	Race											Net points	Final rank
Athlete	Event	1	2	3	4	5	6	7	8	9	10	M*	Net points	Final rank
Napalai Tansai	RS:X	24	24	23	23	25	25	18	~~DSQ~~	22	22	EL	206	24

M = Medal race; EL = Eliminated – did not advance into the medal race;

== Shooting ==
Thailand's Sutiya Jiewchaloemmit has ensured a quota place for Thailand in the women's skeet event.

Men

Athlete	Event	Qualification		Final	
Athlete	Event	Points	Rank	Points	Rank
Jakkrit Panichpatikum	50 m pistol	558	14	Did not advance	
Jakkrit Panichpatikum	25 m rapid fire pistol	578	15	Did not advance	
Jakkrit Panichpatikum	10 m air pistol	566	37	Did not advance	

Women

Athlete	Event	Qualification		Final	
Athlete	Event	Points	Rank	Points	Rank
Sutiya Jiewchaloemmit	Skeet	65	11	Did not advance	
Tanyaporn Prucksakorn	25 m pistol	586	2 Q	778.4	8
Tanyaporn Prucksakorn	10 m air pistol	383	11	Did not advance	
Naphaswan Yangpaiboon	25 m pistol	566	36	Did not advance	
Naphaswan Yangpaiboon	10 m air pistol	370	41	Did not advance	

== Swimming ==
Thai swimmers have so far achieved qualifying standards in the following events (up to a maximum of 2 swimmers in each event at the Olympic Qualifying Time (OQT), and potentially 1 at the Olympic Selection Time (OST)):

Men

Athlete	Event	Heat		Semifinal		Final	
Athlete	Event	Time	Rank	Time	Rank	Time	Rank
Nuttapong Ketin	200 m breaststroke	2:16.07	30	Did not advance			
Nuttapong Ketin	200 m individual medley	2:02.90	34	Did not advance			

Women

Athlete	Event	Heat		Semifinal		Final	
Athlete	Event	Time	Rank	Time	Rank	Time	Rank
Natthanan Junkrajang	200 m freestyle	2:02.49	30	Did not advance			
Natthanan Junkrajang	400 m freestyle	4:16.45	29	—		Did not advance	

== Table tennis ==
Thailand has qualified the following athletes.

Athlete	Event	Preliminary round	Round 1	Round 2	Round 3	Round 4	Quarterfinals	Semifinals	Final / BM	
Athlete	Event	Opposition Result	Opposition Result	Opposition Result	Opposition Result	Opposition Result	Opposition Result	Opposition Result	Opposition Result	Rank
Nanthana Komwong	Women's singles	Bye	Mendes (POR); W 4–3	Vacenovská (CZE); L 1–4	Did not advance					

== Taekwondo ==
Pen-Ek Karaket has ensured a quota place for Thailand in the men's −58 kg by reaching the top 3 of the 2011 WTF World Qualification Tournament.

Athlete	Event	Round of 16	Quarterfinals	Semifinals	Repechage	Bronze Medal	Final	
Athlete	Event	Opposition Result	Opposition Result	Opposition Result	Opposition Result	Opposition Result	Opposition Result	Rank
Pen-Ek Karaket	Men's −58 kg	Lee D-H (KOR); L 7–8 SDP	Did not advance		Bayoumi (EGY); W 6–4	Muñoz (COL); L 4–6	Did not advance	5
Chanatip Sonkham	Women's −49 kg	Kim (RUS); W 13–0 PTG	Yang S-C (TPE); W 6–0	Yagüe (ESP); L 9–10	Bye	Zamora (GUA); W 8–0	Did not advance	3rd place, bronze medalist(s)
Rangsiya Nisaisom	Women's −57 kg	Tseng L-C (TPE); L 1–4	Did not advance					

== Weightlifting ==
Thailand has qualified 3 men and 4 women.

Men

Athlete	Event	Snatch		Clean & Jerk		Total	Rank
Athlete	Event	Total	Rank	Total	Rank	Total	Rank
Atthaphon Daengchanthuek	−69 kg	130	18	170	14	300	16
Chatuphum Chinnawong	−77 kg	157	4	191	4	348	4
Pitaya Tibnoke	−85 kg	152	14	196	10	348	12

Women

Athlete	Event	Snatch		Clean & Jerk		Total	Rank
Athlete	Event	Total	Rank	Total	Rank	Total	Rank
Panida Khamsri	−48 kg	~~81~~	DNF	—	—	—	DNF
Sirivimon Pramongkhol	−48 kg	82	4	109	4	191	4
Pimsiri Sirikaew	−58 kg	100	9	136	2	236	2nd place, silver medalist(s)
Rattikan Gulnoi	−58 kg	100	9	134	3	234	3rd place, bronze medalist(s)
