= Gurbaksh Singh Sandhu =

Indian boxing coach

Gurbaksh Singh Sandhu (Punjabi: ਗੁਰ੍ਬਾਕਸ਼ ਸਿੰਘ ਸੰਧੂ), also spelled as Gurbax/Gurbux Singh Sandhu, was the national boxing coach of India. He started coaching the India National Team from the year 1993. He was influential in bringing a medal to India in 2008 Summer Olympics, when Vijender Singh of India won bronze, which was the first ever medal for India in Boxing at Olympics. He has also helped Indian boxers in their performances in World Championship. He stopped coaching boxing of India until July 2013.

== Early life ==
Sandhu's association with the sport of boxing goes back to his childhood days at Sainik School, Jamnagar, where boxing was a compulsory discipline.

He was a state champion but as he says, his inclination was more towards studies. However, destiny willed otherwise and after finishing school, Sandhu joined Government Sports College, Jalandhar, and later studied to acquire a diploma in boxing coaching from the NIS in 1975. He went to Germany to pursue Masters in Sports and on his return, joined NIS in 1977-78.

Two of his apprentice boxers reached the quarter-finals of 2008 Summer Olympics, and Vijender Singh won a bronze medal. In 2012 Olympics, two boxers reached the quarter-finals. He was also successful in making more boxers qualify for the Olympics. Eight Indian boxers had qualified for the London Olympics 2012.

== Performance of boxers in Olympics ==
=== 2008 Olympics ===
Athlete	Event	Round of 32	Round of 16	Quarterfinals	Semifinals	Final	Overall
Athlete	Event	Opposition Result	Opposition Result	Opposition Result	Opposition Result	Opposition Result	Rank
Jitender Kumar	Flyweight	Memis (TUR); W (Opponent retired)	Doniyorov (UZB); W 13 : 6	Balakshin (RUS); L 15 : 11	Did not advance		
Akhil Kumar	Bantamweight	Hallab (FRA); W 12 : 5	Vodopyanov (RUS); W +9 : 9	Gojan (MDA); L 10 : 3	Did not advance		
Anthresh Lalit Lakra	Featherweight	Sultonov (UZB); L 9 : 5	Did not advance				
Vijender Singh	Middleweight	Badou (GAM); W 13 : 2	Chomphuphuang (THA); W 13 : 3	Góngora (ECU); W 9 : 4	Correa (CUB); L 8 : 5	Did not advance	Bronze
Dinesh Kumar	Light heavyweight	Benchabla (ALG); L 3 : 23 (stopped by referee)	Did not advance				

=== 2012 Olympics ===
Men

Athlete	Event	Round of 32	Round of 16	Quarterfinals	Semifinals	Final	
Athlete	Event	Opposition Result	Opposition Result	Opposition Result	Opposition Result	Opposition Result	Rank
Devendro Singh	Light flyweight	Molina (HON); W RSC	Purevdorj (MGL); W 16–11	Barnes (IRL); L 18-23	Did not advance		
Shiva Thapa	Bantamweight	Valdez (MEX); L 9–14	Did not advance				
Jai Bhagwan	Lightweight	Allisop (SEY); W 18–8	Zhailaouv (KAZ); L 8–16	Did not advance			
Manoj Kumar	Light welterweight	Hudayberdiyev (TKM); W 13–7	Stalker (GBR); L 16–20	Did not advance			
Vikas Krishan Yadav	Welterweight	Bye	Spence (USA); L 13–15	Did not advance			
Vijender Singh	Middleweight	Suzhanov (KAZ); W 14–10	Gausha (USA); W 16–15	Atoev (UZB); L 13–17	Did not advance		
Sumit Sangwan	Light heavyweight	Falcão (BRA); L 14–15	Did not advance				
