= 2013 AIBA World Boxing Championships – Light flyweight =

Boxing competitions

The Light flyweight competition at the 2013 AIBA World Boxing Championships was held from 16–26 October 2013. Boxers were limited to a maximum of 49 kilograms in body mass.

== Medalists ==
Gold	Birzhan Zhakypov (KAZ)
Silver	Mohamed Flissi (ALG)
Bronze	Yosvany Veitía (CUB)
Bronze	David Jiménez (CRC)

== Seeds ==
1. (Kazakhstan) Birzhan Zhakypov (champion)
2. (Brazil) Patrick Lourenco (quarterfinals)
3. (England) Jack Bateson (second round)
4. (Japan) Tosho Kashiwasaki (second round)
5. (Cuba) Yosvany Veitía (semifinals)
6. (Azerbaijan) Salman Alizade (third round)
7. (China) Lü Bin (third round)
8. (Puerto Rico) Anthony Chacón (quarterfinals)

== Draw ==
=== Finals ===
Semifinals
1	(Kazakhstan) Birzhan Zhakypov	3
4	(Cuba) Yosvany Veitía	0
3	(Costa Rica) David Jiménez	0
2	(Algeria) Mohamed Flissi	3

Final
(Kazakhstan) Birzhan Zhakypov	3
(Algeria) Mohamed Flissi	0

=== Top half ===
==== Section 1 ====
First Round
(Ukraine) Vadym Kudryakov	0
(Russia) Belik Galanov	3

Second Round
(Kazakhstan) Birzhan Zhakypov	3
(Russia) Belik Galanov	0
(Botswana) Mooketsi Lekgetho	0
(Uzbekistan) Hasanboy Dusmatov	3
(Scotland) Aqeel Ahmed	0
(India) Nanao Singh Thokchom	3
(Venezuela) Ronald Leon	1
(Puerto Rico) Anthony Chacón	2

Third Round
(Kazakhstan) Birzhan Zhakypov	3
(Uzbekistan) Hasanboy Dusmatov	0
(India) Nanao Singh Thokchom	0
(Puerto Rico) Anthony Chacón	3

Quarterfinals
(Kazakhstan) Birzhan Zhakypov	3
(Puerto Rico) Anthony Chacón	0

==== Section 2 ====
First Round
(Vietnam) Huynh Ngoc	0
(Philippines) Mark Barriga	3
(Italy) Manuel Cappai	3
(Kyrgyzstan) Turat Osmonov	0

Second Round
(Cuba) Yosvany Veitía	3
(Philippines) Mark Barriga	0
(Wales) Ashley Williams	2
(Sri Lanka) Malith Muthukarage	1
(North Korea) Ri Chung	3
(United States) Leroy Davila	0
(Italy) Manuel Cappai	3
(Japan) Tosho Kashiwasaki	0

Third Round
(Cuba) Yosvany Veitía	WO
(Wales) Ashley Williams
(North Korea) Ri Chung	1
(Italy) Manuel Cappai	2

Quarterfinals
(Cuba) Yosvany Veitía	2
(Italy) Manuel Cappai	1

=== Bottom half ===
==== Section 3 ====
First Round
(Armenia) Koryun Soghomonyan	1
(Costa Rica) David Jiménez	2
(Nigeria) Wasiu Taiwo	0
(Bulgaria) Georgi Andonov	3

Second Round
(England) Jack Bateson	1
(Costa Rica) David Jiménez	2
(Germany) Serge Neumann	3
(Israel) David Albridian	0
(South Korea) Kim In-Kyu	3
(Kenya) Peter Warui	0
(Bulgaria) Georgi Andonov	0
(Azerbaijan) Salman Alizade	3

Third Round
(Costa Rica) David Jiménez	WO
(Germany) Serge Neumann
(South Korea) Kim In-Kyu	3
(Azerbaijan) Salman Alizade	0

Quarterfinals
(Costa Rica) David Jiménez	2
(South Korea) Kim In-Kyu	0

==== Section 4 ====
First Round
(Australia) Joshua English	1
(Thailand) Tanes Ongjunta	2

Second Round
(China) Lü Bin	3
(Romania) Ovidiu Berceanu	0
(Algeria) Mohamed Flissi	2
(Mexico) Joselito Velázquez	1
(Mongolia) Gan-Erdene Gankhuyag	3
(Hungary) István Ungvári	0
(Thailand) Tanes Ongjunta	0
(Brazil) Patrick Lourenco	3

Third Round
(China) Lü Bin	1
(Algeria) Mohamed Flissi	2
(Mongolia) Gan-Erdene Gankhuyag	0
(Brazil) Patrick Lourenco	3

Quarterfinals
(Algeria) Mohamed Flissi	2
(Brazil) Patrick Lourenco	1
