= Khoijuman =

- Village
- khoijuman Location in Manipur, India
- Coordinates: 24.61°N 93.78°E
- Country: India
- State: Manipur
- District: Bishnupur

Population
  - Total: 3,000(approx)

Khoijuman is a small village situated within the Bishnupur district in the Indian state of Manipur. It is located about 30 km (19 mi) to the south of Imphal. It has population of about 3000 (approx) with 1460 are males and 1490 are females.

== Tourist spots ==
In this village there is one Laikon where everyone of this village celebrates Lai Haraoba annually in Lamta-Sajibu(according to Meetei Calendar which occurred in month March–April of Gregorian calendar).

== Demographics and geography ==
khoijuman is further divided into 4 sectors

- Khoijuman khunou
- Khoijuman khullen
- Khoijuman keithel(market)
- Khoijuman Kabui

It has literacy of about 77%

- Females = 68%
- Males = 86% .

== Sports ==
Nanao Thokchom (born 8 January 1991) is an Indian boxer from Khoijuman Maning Leikai village in Bishnupur district of Manipur.

== See also ==
- Bishnupur
- Ningthoukhong
- Nanao Thokchom
