= Philippines at the 2012 Summer Olympics =

- Flag of the Philippines
- IOC code: PHI
- NOC: Philippine Olympic Committee
- Website: www.olympic.ph

in London
- Competitors: 11 in 8 sports
- Flag bearers: Hidilyn Diaz (opening); Jasmine Alkhaldi (closing)
- Medals: Gold 0 Silver 0 Bronze 0 Total 0

Summer Olympics appearances (overview)
- 1924; 1928; 1932; 1936; 1948; 1952; 1956; 1960; 1964; 1968; 1972; 1976; 1980; 1984; 1988; 1992; 1996; 2000; 2004; 2008; 2012; 2016; 2020; 2024; 2028

The Philippines competed at the 2012 Summer Olympics, which was held in London, from 27 July to 12 August 2012. This was the nation's twentieth appearance at the Olympics.

The Philippine Olympic Committee sent the nation's smallest delegation to the Games since 1996. A total of 11 athletes, 7 men and 4 women, competed in 8 sports. Four athletes received their spots in track and field, and in swimming by wild card entries. Other Filipino athletes won their spots by participating in various qualifying matches around the world. Three athletes had competed in Beijing, including weightlifter Hidilyn Diaz, who became the nation's first female flag bearer at the opening ceremony. The Philippines marked its Olympic return in cycling, and in judo. For the fourth time in a row, the Philippines did not earn any medals at the 2012 Summer Olympics.

== Background ==
The chef de mission of the Philippine team was Manny Lopez, vice president of the Philippine Olympic Committee (POC). Before the games, he said that he was looking to boxing's Mark Anthony Barriga and BMX racing's Daniel Caluag as the two athletes with the most potential to end the country's Olympic medal drought. However, POC chairperson Monico Puentevella tried to lower expectations, telling sportswriters not to expect any medal, and saying it would be a "miracle" if any of the eleven athletes in the contingent bring home a medal of any color. The country has not won a medal at the Olympics since the 1996 Summer Olympics in Atlanta, where Mansueto Velasco won a silver for boxing.

The 30-minute flag raising ceremony for the Philippine team was held at the Olympic Village on 22 July, attended by eight of the eleven Philippine Olympic athletes, five team officials, and other invited guests. The country was ninth out of 204 to have its flag raised as part of the Olympic tradition.

Beginning in 2013, the Southeast Asian Games will shift its focus to the staging of traditional Olympic sports, rather than the indigenous events which have not gained wide recognition outside the region. The Philippines is a major participant in the SEA Games, which is held every 2 years with supervision by the International Olympic Committee and the Olympic Council of Asia.

== Opening ceremony ==
The Olympic uniform worn by the athletes during the opening ceremony was a modern take on the barong Tagalog, a distinct form of formal wear featuring embroidered translucent fabric. The uniform was designed by Filipino fashion designer Rajo Laurel, who serves as a judge on Project Runway Philippines. His rendition of the barong Tagalog has a more tapered fit, slightly cropped length, and small fabrication changes while paying great respect to tradition. This is paired with weight wool flat front trousers, and a salakot with a golf leaf designed to catch the light as the athletes march into the stadium.

Twenty-one-year-old weightlifter Hidilyn Diaz from Zamboanga City, who competed at her second consecutive Olympics, acted as the nation's flag bearer in the opening ceremonies, the first by a female in Olympic history. She was unanimously selected by the POC board for the honor of carrying the flag.

== Overview by sports ==
=== Archery ===
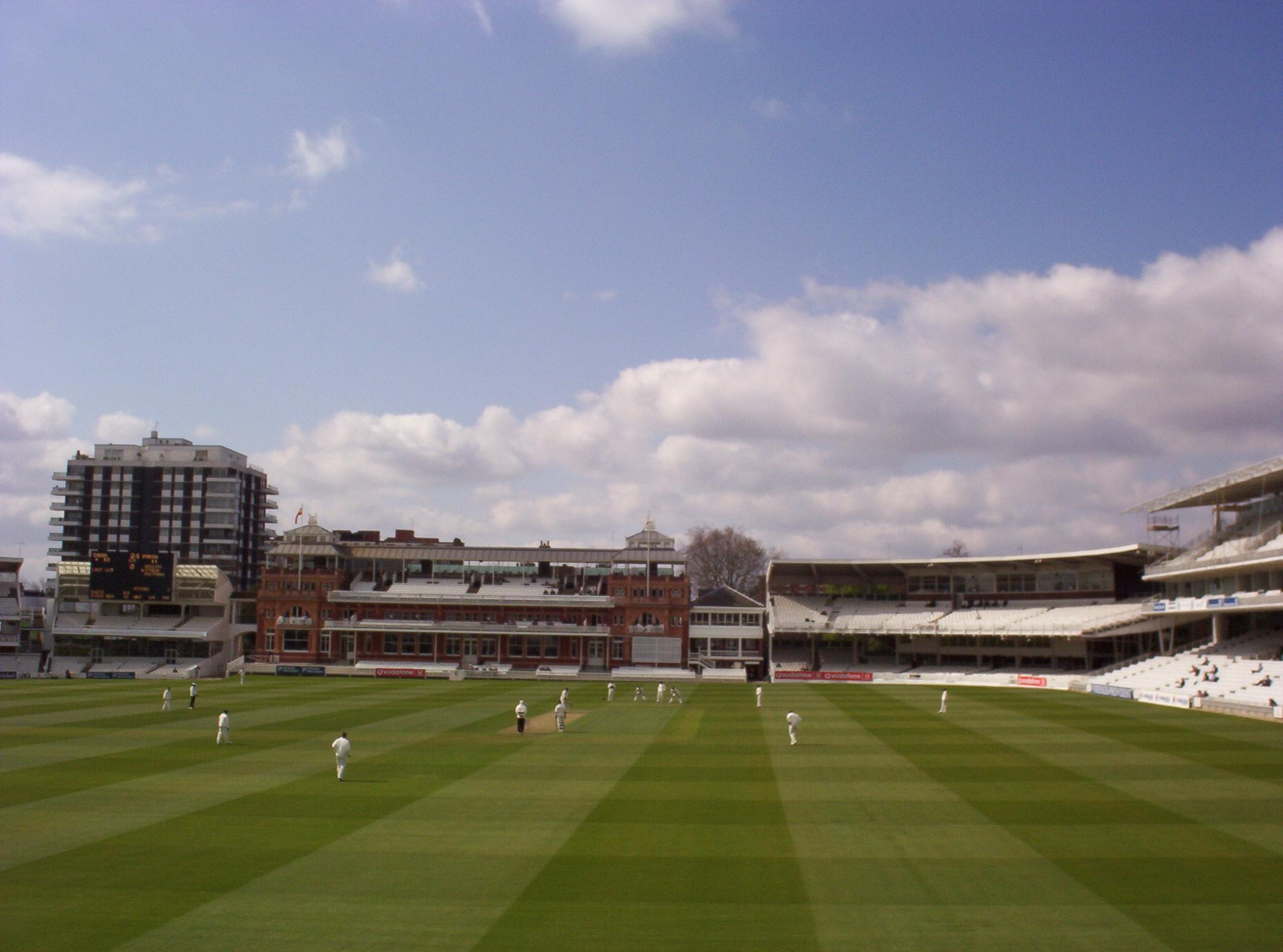
Archery events were held at the Lord's Cricket Ground.

The Philippines was represented in archery events by two athletes, Mark Javier and Rachelle Anne Cabral. As part of their final preparations in the build-up to the Olympics, the two archers underwent 10 days of training in South Korea under Korean coach Chung Jae Yun. Archery events in the London games were held at the Lord's Cricket Ground.

Mark Javier competed in the men's individual event. This was his second Olympic Games, having previously competed in the same event at the 2008 Summer Olympics, where he placed 36th of 64 in the ranking round and was eliminated in first round of the tournament. In the ranking round held on 28 July, he scored 649 of a possible 720. This ranked him 55th of the 64 competitors, setting up a first round match-up with Brady Ellison of the United States, who is ranked #1 in the world. In the match with Ellison, the American won the first, second, and fourth sets, with the third set resulting in a draw. The final score had Ellison winning 7-1, eliminating Javier from the tournament.

Rachel Anne Cabral competed in the women's individual event. She scored 627 in the ranking round held on 28 July, which placed her 48th out of 64 competitors. In the first round of the knockout she faced Inna Stepanova of Russia. Stepanova won the first, second, and fourth set, with the third set resulting in a draw. The final score had Stepanova winning 7-1, which eliminated Cabral from the tournament.

Another archery athlete with Philippine roots competing at the Olympics was Filipino-Canadian Crispin Dueñas. Dueñas was born in Toronto where his parents had immigrated from the Philippines. Despite being a member of the Canadian team at the games, he had previously received offers, and had considered, to join the Philippine delegation. Dueñas was unable to advance past the first stage of the knockout tournament.

Athlete	Event	Ranking round		Round of 64	Round of 32	Round of 16	Quarterfinals	Semifinals	Final / BM	
Athlete	Event	Score	Seed	Opposition Score	Opposition Score	Opposition Score	Opposition Score	Opposition Score	Opposition Score	Rank
Mark Javier	Men's individual	649	55	Ellison (USA) (10); L 1–7	Did not advance					
Rachelle Anne Cabral	Women's individual	627	48	Stepanova (RUS) (17); L 1–7	Did not advance					

=== Athletics ===
The Philippines was represented in the woman's long jump event by Marestella Torres, the only competitor from Southeast Asia in the event. This was her second Olympic Games, having previously competed in the same event at the 2008 Summer Olympics. Her personal best in the long jump is 6.71 meters, a national record, achieved at the 2011 Southeast Asian Games in Jakarta where she won the gold. Torres achieved a jump of 5.98 meters on her first attempt, followed by 6.21 meters on her second attempt, and 6.22 meters on her third and best jump. Her mark of 6.22 meters was good for 22nd place in a field of 28, failing to qualify in the top 12 who would advance to the finals.

Rene Herrera represented the country in the men's 5000 meters event, where he was the only competitor from Southeast Asia. Herrera was a specialist in the 3000 meter steeplechase, having won the gold at the previous five Southeast Asian Games, but was drafted to run the 5000 meters event in the Olympics because of the availability of a slot to compete under the universality rule. He finished the heat with a time of 14:44.11, which was a personal best, and just 10 seconds off his target time. In spite of that, he finished with the slowest time of the 42 starters in the heats, and did not move on to the finals.

Men

Athlete	Event	Heat		Final	
Athlete	Event	Result	Rank	Result	Rank
Rene Herrera	5000 m	14:44.11	20	Did not advance	

Women

Athlete	Event	Qualification		Final	
Athlete	Event	Distance	Position	Distance	Position
Marestella Torres	Long jump	6.22	22	Did not advance	

Key

- Note–Ranks given for track events are within the athlete's heat only
- Q = Qualified for the next round
- q = Qualified for the next round as a fastest loser or, in field events, by position without achieving the qualifying target
- NR = National record
- N/A = Round not applicable for the event
- Bye = Athlete not required to compete in round

=== Boxing ===
Boxing has traditionally been the Philippines' strongest sport at the Olympics. Five of the nine medals won by the Philippines in Olympic history came from boxing, including its only two silver medals. The last time the country won an Olympic medal from a non-boxing event was at the 1936 Summer Olympics.

Mark Anthony Barriga, from Panabo, Davao del Norte, was the Philippines' only representative in the sport of boxing at the 2012 Summer Olympics, where he competed in the light flyweight division. He qualified for the Olympics after competing at the 2011 World Amateur Boxing Championships in Baku, Azerbaijan. Though he lost to Zou Shiming of China in the third round of the competition, the International Boxing Association announced in a qualification quirk that Barriga would qualify for the Olympics for losing to the eventual tournament champion. Prior to the start of the Olympics, Barriga trained for three weeks in Cardiff, Wales. He was coached by Roel Velasco, who won a bronze medal for boxing in the 1992 Summer Olympics.

In the opening match of the light flyweight division, Barriga scored a convincing 17-7 victory over Manuel Cappai of Italy. In the next match, against Birzhan Zhakypov of Kazakhstan, Barriga lost by a single point, with a bout resulting in a score of 17-16. Barriga lead the fight by two points at the end of the second round, however he received a warning in the third and final round for ducking, resulting in his opponent receiving two critical additional points which decided the outcome of the match. Immediately after the bout, the Amateur Boxing Association of the Philippines filed a protest, saying that Barriga should have instead been given a "caution" which normally precedes a warning. However the protest was rejected without the protest committee reviewing the fight tape, saying that the appeal was made on emotional rather than technical grounds.

Another Filipino boxer, Charly Suarez, nearly qualified for the Olympic games but had to settle for the silver at the 2012 Asian Boxing Olympic Qualification Tournament, which rewarded only the gold medalist with a spot in the Olympics.

Men

Athlete	Event	Round of 32	Round of 16	Quarterfinals	Semifinals	Final	
Athlete	Event	Opposition Result	Opposition Result	Opposition Result	Opposition Result	Opposition Result	Rank
Mark Anthony Barriga	Light flyweight	Cappai (ITA); W 17–7	Zhakypov (KAZ); L 16–17	Did not advance			

=== Cycling ===
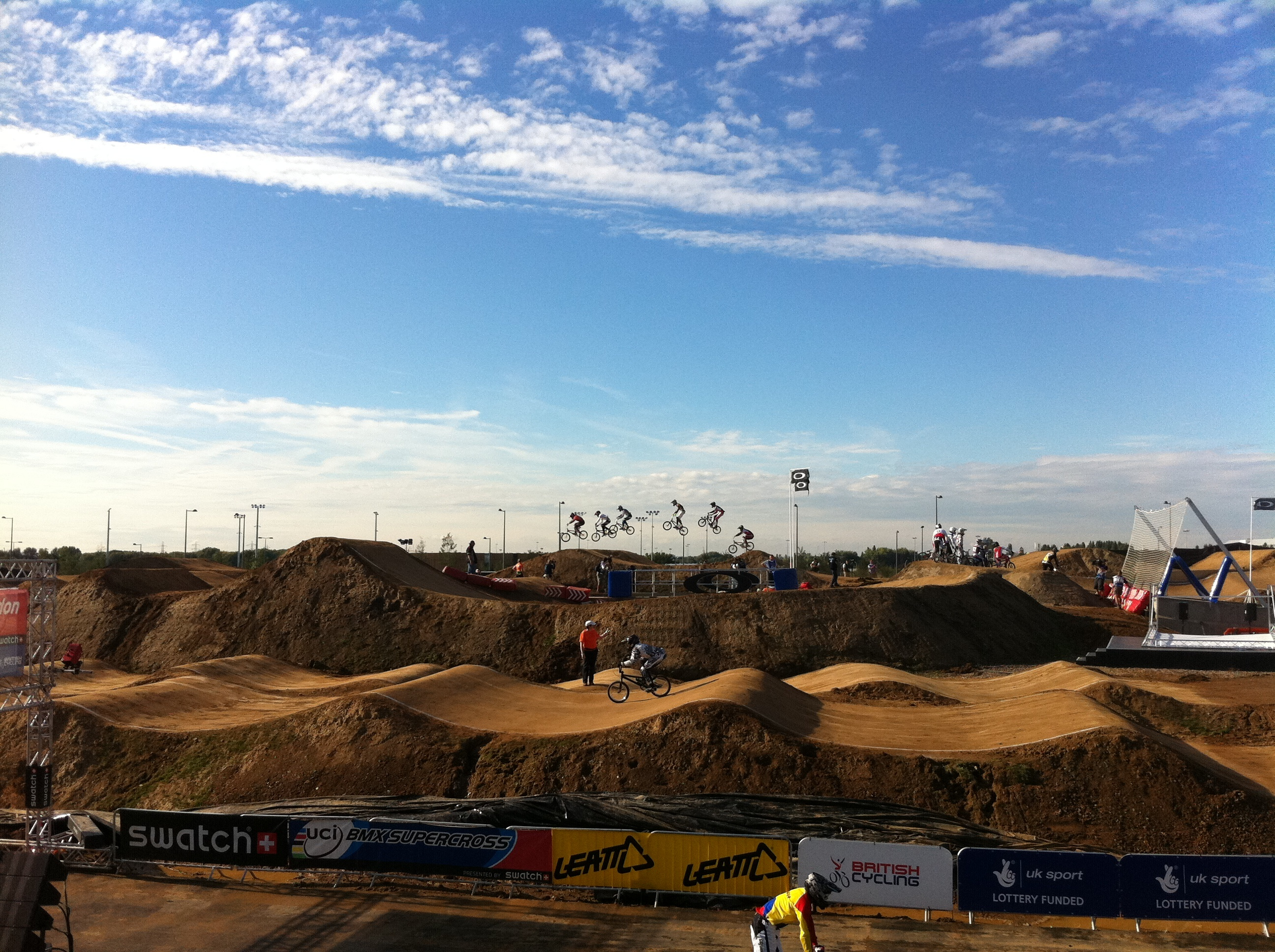
The BMX track at the London Velopark.

The Philippines was represented in cycling by Filipino-American Daniel Caluag, who had reigned for four years as the number one ranked BMX rider in the United States, and qualified for a spot in the Olympic Games by accumulating enough points on the international circuit. Unable to utilize training facilities at the United States Olympic Training Center in Chula Vista, California, Caluag trained instead in the Netherlands prior to the Olympics.

Athlete	Event	Seeding		Quarterfinal		Semifinal		Final	
Athlete	Event	Result	Rank	Points	Rank	Points	Rank	Result	Rank
Daniel Caluag	Men's BMX	40.900	31	29	8	Did not advance			

=== Judo ===
Filipino-Japanese judoka Tomohiko Hoshina was the sole representative of the Philippines in judo at the 2012 Summer Olympics. Hoshina, who carries dual citizenship, has candidly admitted that the reason he was part of the Philippine team in the Olympics was because he had a much higher chance of making it to the games as a Filipino rather than as a Japanese citizen. He qualified for the Olympics through what is called "continental allocation", securing the slot after earning 27 ranking points during the 2011 World Judo Championships in Paris and the 2011 Asian Judo Championships in Abu Dhabi. As part of his preparation for the Olympic games, he trained in Tokyo under Japanese mentor Yasuhiro Sato.

Hoshina entered the Olympic tournament as a heavy underdog against his first competitor, Kim Sung-Min of South Korea. Kim had previously defeated Hoshina at the 2011 World Judo Championships and the 2011 Asian Judo Championships. On 3 August, Hoshina lost to Kim by ippon (full-point throw), eliminating him from the tournament. The match lasted only 1 minute and 5 seconds, and was the second quickest bout of the division.

Athlete	Event	Round of 32	Round of 16	Quarterfinals	Semifinals	Repechage	Final / BM	
Athlete	Event	Opposition Result	Opposition Result	Opposition Result	Opposition Result	Opposition Result	Opposition Result	Rank
Tomohiko Hoshina	Men's +100 kg	Kim S-m (KOR); L 0000–0100	Did not advance					

=== Shooting ===
In shooting, the Philippines was represented by Paul Brian Rosario, who competed in the men's skeet event. He was selected by the International Shooting Sport Federation as the wild card entry to represent the country following a string of impressive performances in international shooting tournaments in the previous four years. Rosario hit the minimum qualifying score for the Olympics six times since 2008. At the men's skeet event of the ISSF World Cup in Belgrade, he set a new Philippine record of 120, which is one point shy of the gold medal winning performance by Vincent Hancock at the 2008 Summer Olympics.

In the first day of the qualification round at the London Olympics, Rosario garnered a score of 22 in the first round, 19 in the second round, and a perfect 25 in the third round, ending the day ranked 32nd. Rosario was quoted by his coach as saying that he was "terribly disappointed" by his score of 19 in the second round, which was marred by three consecutive misses in the middle of the string. However, his score of 25 in the third round was notable for being the first perfect score by a Filipino shooter at the Olympics. In the second day of qualifications, he scored 22 in the fourth round, and another 22 in the fifth round. His final score of 110 placed him in rank 31 out of 36 competitors, far from the top-6 finish required to move on to the final round.

Men

Athlete	Event	Qualification		Final	
Athlete	Event	Score	Rank	Score	Rank
Brian Rosario	Skeet	109	31	Did not advance	

=== Swimming ===
In swimming events at the Olympics, the Philippines was represented by two swimmers— 18-year-old Jessie Lacuna in the men's 200 meter freestyle event, and 19-year-old Jasmine Alkhaldi in the women's 100 meter freestyle event.

On July 29, in the second of six heats of the men's 200 meter freestyle event, Jessie Lacuna finished with a time of 1:52.91, placing him fifth in a field of seven swimmers for the heat. This was 2 seconds off of his personal best of 1:50.90, set during an invitational tournament in Singapore two years prior. His performance in the heat was good for 36th place among the 40 starters in the Olympic event, meaning he did not advance to the semi-finals, as only the top 16 swimmers with the best times in the heats would advance. His coach Pinky Brosas later said that Lacuna was too fast in the first 100 meters and could not follow up, and that it would be a learning experience.

In the women's 100 meter freestyle event, Jasmine Alkhaldi finished with a time of 57.13 seconds in the heat, the fifth best finish among the eight starters in the third heat. This is slightly behind her submitted personal best of 56.92 seconds. Overall she ranked 34th among the 50 competitors in the event. Only the top 16 swimmers with the best times in the heats would advance, meaning Alkhaldi did not move on to the semifinals.

Men

Athlete	Event	Heat		Semifinal		Final	
Athlete	Event	Time	Rank	Time	Rank	Time	Rank
Jessie Lacuna	200 m freestyle	1:52.91	36	Did not advance			

Women

Athlete	Event	Heat		Semifinal		Final	
Athlete	Event	Time	Rank	Time	Rank	Time	Rank
Jasmine Alkhaldi	100 m freestyle	57.13	34	Did not advance			

=== Weightlifting ===
The Philippines was represented in weightlifting by 21 year old Hidilyn Diaz, who competed in the women's 58 kg event. She was the first Filipino weightlifter to represent the country in two consecutive Olympics. She previously competed in the same event four years earlier at the 2008 Summer Olympics in Beijing, where she entered as a wildcard entry and placed 11th out of 12 competitors. She was the lightest of the competitors in the event at the time, and her result of 192 kilograms, though setting a Philippine record, was far from the 244 kilograms posted by gold medalist Chen Yanqing of China. Since then, however, she had improved her personal best to 219 kilograms, which raises the Philippine record by 2 kilograms from her fourth-place finish at the 2012 Asian Weightlifting Championships held in Pyeongtaek, South Korea in previous April 2012. While this remains far from the mark set by Chen, Diaz has said that it could put her in contention for a medal.

On the instructions of her coach Tony Agustin, Diaz submitted a projected lift of 225 kilograms, which is above her personal high of 219 kilograms. At the event, she successfully lifted a personal best of 97 kilograms in the snatch, which was the 12th best showing among the 19 competitors. However, she was unsuccessful in all three attempts to lift her opening weight of 118 kilograms in the clean and jerk. In her first two attempts at lifting 118 kilograms, she was able to go through the clean, but twice failed to complete the jerk. On the third attempt, she failed to go through the clean, as the weights slipped and fell to the floor. She then waved tearfully to the crowd, and walked into the arms of her coach who was waiting in the sidelines. She was one of two competitors (along with Lina Rivas of Colombia) to end with an official result of "Did not finish" (DNF) in the event.

Diaz was the flag bearer of the Philippine delegation during the parade of nations at the Olympic opening ceremony on 27 July.

Athlete	Event	Snatch		Clean & Jerk		Total	Rank
Athlete	Event	Result	Rank	Result	Rank	Total	Rank
Hidilyn Diaz	Women's −58 kg	97	13	~~118~~	DNF	97	DNF
