= Kaeo Pongprayoon =

Thai boxer

Kaeo Pongprayoon TM TBh RChM
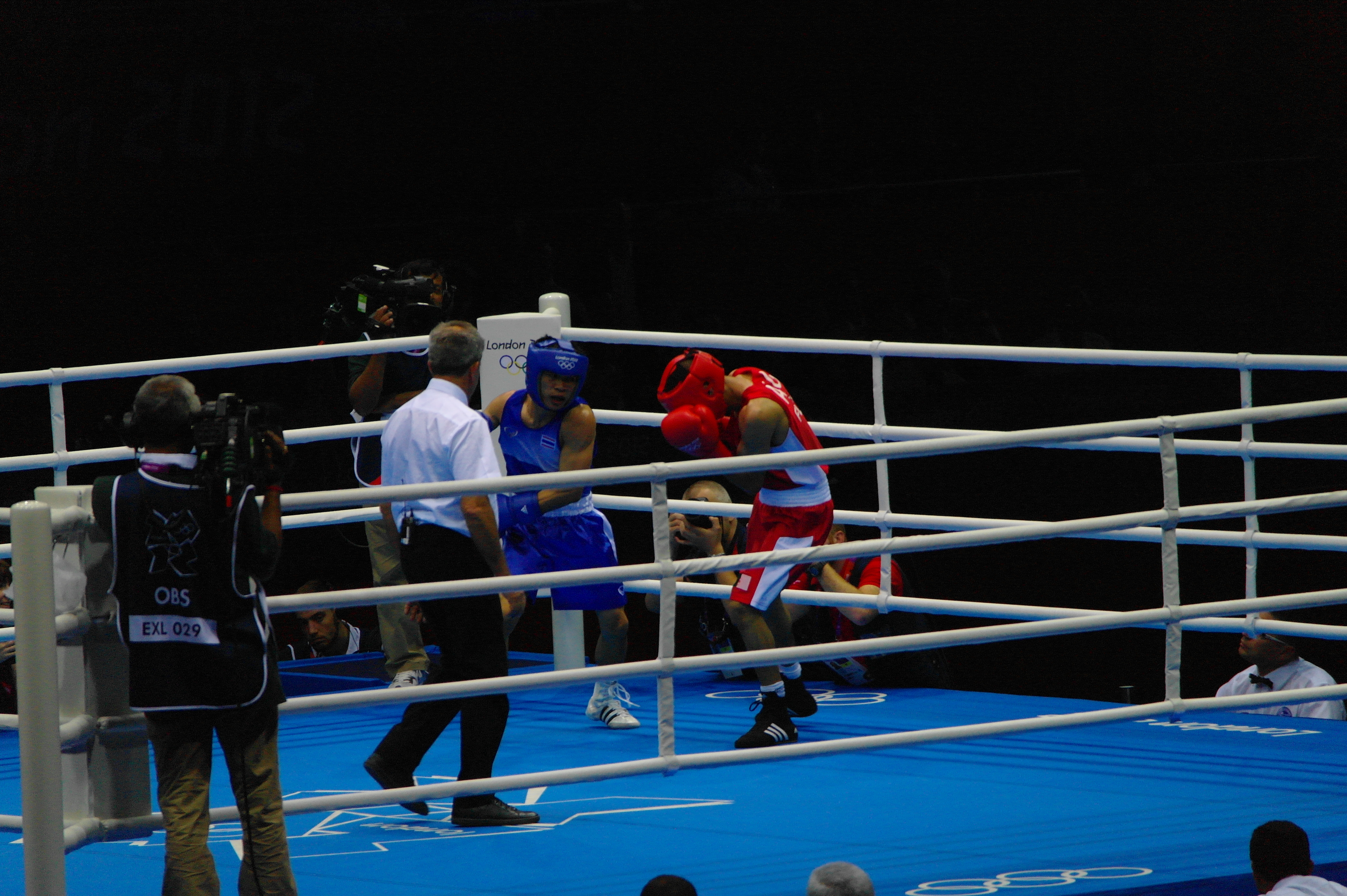
- First round bout against M. Flissi (red) at the 2012 Olympics

Personal information
- Born: 28 March 1980 (age 46) Kamphaeng Phet, Thailand
- Height: 1.60 m (5 ft 3 in)

Sport
- Country: Thailand
- Sport: Boxing
- Event: Light flyweight
Medal record
Olympic Games
Silver medal – second place	2012 London	Light flyweight
Asian Amateur Championships
Gold medal – first place	2009 Zhuhai	Light flyweight
Southeast Asian Games
Gold medal – first place	2003 Hanoi	Pinweight
Gold medal – first place	2007 Nakhon Ratchasima	Pinweight
Gold medal – first place	2009 Vientiane	Light flyweight
Gold medal – first place	2011 Palembang	Light flyweight
Bronze medal – third place	2001 Kuala Lumpur	Pinweight
Bronze medal – third place	2005 Bacolod	Pinweight

Kaeo Pongprayoon (Thai: แก้ว พงษ์ประยูร, RTGS: Kaeo Phongprayun, pronounced [kɛ̂ːw pʰōŋ.prā.jūːn]; born 28 March 1980 in Kamphaeng Phet) is a Thai amateur boxer who won a silver medal at the 2012 Summer Olympics.

Pongprayoon won the 2009 Asian Amateur Boxing Championships and the 2009 Southeast Asian Games and 2011 at light flyweight.

At the 2009 World Amateur Boxing Championships he lost his third fight to José Kelvin de la Nieve.

At the 2011 World Amateur Boxing Championships he beat two opponents, then lost 8:14 to Zou Shiming.

At the 2012 Summer Olympics (results) he won his first fight against Algerian Mohamed Flissi 19:11, then defeated Ecuador's Carlos Quipo and Bulgarian Aleksandar Aleksandrov. He reached the final by edging out Russian David Ayrapetyan 13:12. He controversially lost the final to Zou Shiming 10:13.
