= 2009 Asian Amateur Boxing Championships =

Boxing competitions

2009 Asian Boxing Championships
- Host city: Zhuhai, China
- Dates: 7–13 June 2009
- Main venue: Zhuhai Sports Center Stadium

The 25th edition of the Men's Asian Amateur Boxing Championships were held from June 7 to June 13, 2009 in Zhuhai, China.

== Medal summary ==
Event	Gold	Silver	Bronze
Light flyweight 48 kg	Kaeo Pongprayoon; Thailand	Nanao Singh Thokchom; India	Nyambayaryn Tögstsogt; Mongolia
Light flyweight 48 kg	Kaeo Pongprayoon; Thailand	Nanao Singh Thokchom; India	Ri Chung-il; North Korea
Flyweight; 51 kg	Suranjoy Singh; India	Li Chao; China	Olzhas Sattibayev; Kazakhstan
Flyweight; 51 kg	Suranjoy Singh; India	Li Chao; China	Amnat Ruenroeng; Thailand
Bantamweight; 54 kg	Ma Yunhao; China	Tulashboy Doniyorov; Uzbekistan	Jitender Kumar; India
Bantamweight; 54 kg	Ma Yunhao; China	Tulashboy Doniyorov; Uzbekistan	Liu Shih-jung; Chinese Taipei
Featherweight; 57 kg	Wuttichai Masuk; Thailand	Hurshid Tojibaev; Uzbekistan	Satoshi Shimizu; Japan
Featherweight; 57 kg	Wuttichai Masuk; Thailand	Hurshid Tojibaev; Uzbekistan	Bariadigiin Javkhlan; Mongolia
Lightweight; 60 kg	Serdar Hudaýberdiýew; Turkmenistan	Jai Bhagwan; India	Zorigtbaataryn Enkhzorig; Mongolia
Lightweight; 60 kg	Serdar Hudaýberdiýew; Turkmenistan	Jai Bhagwan; India	Gani Zhailauov; Kazakhstan
Light welterweight 64 kg	Sanjarbek Rahmonov; Uzbekistan	Houman Karami; Iran	Masatsugu Kawachi; Japan
Light welterweight 64 kg	Sanjarbek Rahmonov; Uzbekistan	Houman Karami; Iran	Chen Tongzhou; China
Welterweight; 69 kg	Serik Sapiyev; Kazakhstan	Omar Mamedşaýew; Turkmenistan	Chang Wei-jen; Chinese Taipei
Welterweight; 69 kg	Serik Sapiyev; Kazakhstan	Omar Mamedşaýew; Turkmenistan	Chen Hongwei; China
Middleweight; 75 kg	Zhang Jianting; China	Ayman Awad; Jordan	Najd Salloum; Lebanon
Middleweight; 75 kg	Zhang Jianting; China	Ayman Awad; Jordan	Vijender Singh; India
Light heavyweight 81 kg	Elshod Rasulov; Uzbekistan	Meng Fanhua; China	Dinesh Kumar; India
Light heavyweight 81 kg	Elshod Rasulov; Uzbekistan	Meng Fanhua; China	Dauren Yeleussinov; Kazakhstan
Heavyweight; 91 kg	Vassiliy Levit; Kazakhstan	Li Bin; China	Ihab Al-Matbouli; Jordan
Heavyweight; 91 kg	Vassiliy Levit; Kazakhstan	Li Bin; China	Ali Mazaheri; Iran
Super heavyweight +91 kg	Zhang Zhilei; China	Sardor Abdullaev; Uzbekistan	Paramjeet Samota; India
Super heavyweight +91 kg	Zhang Zhilei; China	Sardor Abdullaev; Uzbekistan	Ali Akbar Hosseinifar; Iran

== Medal table ==
Rank	Nation	Gold	Silver	Bronze	Total
1	China	3	3	2	8
2	Uzbekistan	2	3	0	5
3	Kazakhstan	2	0	3	5
4	Thailand	2	0	1	3
5	India	1	2	4	7
6	Turkmenistan	1	1	0	2
7	Iran	0	1	2	3
8	Jordan	0	1	1	2
9	Mongolia	0	0	3	3
10	Chinese Taipei	0	0	2	2
10	Japan	0	0	2	2
12	Lebanon	0	0	1	1
12	North Korea	0	0	1	1
Totals (13 entries)		11	11	22	44
