= Bayron Molina =

Honduran boxer

Personal information
- Nationality: Honduran
- Born: 10 May 1993 (age 33)
- Weight: Junior flyweight

Boxing career

Boxing record
- Total fights: 3
- Wins: 3

Bayron Molina Figueroa (born 10 May 1993 in Tegucigalpa, Honduras) is a Honduran boxer who competed at the 2012 Summer Olympics in the light flyweight division where he lost in the first round to Devendro Singh.

== 2012 Olympic results ==
Below is the record of Bayron Molina, who competed at the 2012 London Olympics:

- Round of 32: lost to Devendro Singh (India) referee stopped contest

== Professional boxing record ==
3 fights	3 wins	0 losses
By decision	3	0

No.	Result	Record	Opponent	Type	Round, time	Date	Location	Notes
3	Win	3–0	(Guatemala) Billy Hamilton	SD	6	19 Mar 2016	Gimnasio Las Palmas, San Pedro Sula, Honduras	
2	Win	2–0	(Nicaragua) Roberto Meza	UD	4	19 Sep 2015	Gimnasio Municipal, San Pedro Sula, Honduras	
1	Win	1–0	(Nicaragua) Jonathan Blas	UD	4	11 Jul 2015	Gimnasio Municipal, San Pedro Sula, Honduras	Professional debut
