= Masatsugu Kawachi =

Japanese boxer (born 1985)

Personal information
- Full name: Masatsugu Kawachi
- Nationality: Japan
- Born: November 25, 1985 (age 40) Kashima, Saga Prefecture, Japan
- Height: 5 ft 10 1/2 in (1.79 m)
- Weight: 140 lb (64 kg)

Sport
- Sport: Boxing
- Weight class: Light Welterweight
- Club: Japan Self-Defense Forces
Medal record
World Amateur Championships
Bronze medal – third place	2007 Chicago	Light Welterweight
Asian Championships
Bronze medal – third place	2009 Zhuhai	Light Welterweight

Masatsugu Kawachi (川内 将嗣, Kawachi Masatsugu; born November 25, 1985 in Kashima, Saga) is a Japanese boxer best known for winning bronze at the 2007 world championships at light welterweight.

== Career ==
At the 2007 World Amateur Boxing Championships he sensationally upset Olympic champion Manus Boonjumnong in the first round before being manhandled by eventual winner Serik Sapiyev.

At the 2008 Summer Olympics, he lost the rematch with Manus 1–8.

At the World Championships 2009 he lost his first bout against unsung Egidijus Kavaliauskas. Kawachi then took the bronze medal in the 2009 Asian Amateur Boxing Championships in Zhuhai, China.
