= Pürevdorjiin Serdamba =

Mongolian boxer (born 1985)

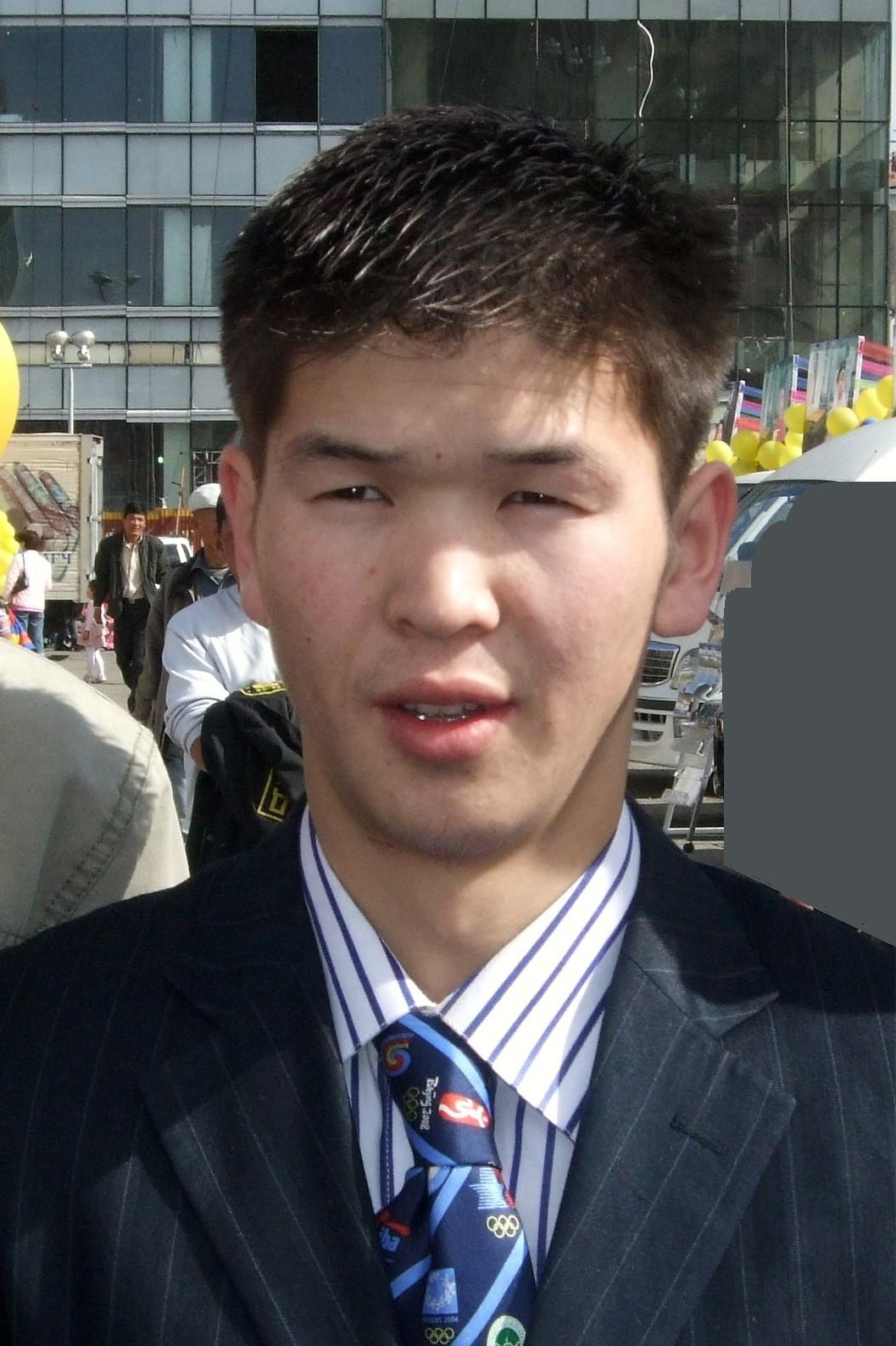
- P.Serdamba in 2008

Personal information
- Nationality: Mongolia
- Born: Пүрэвдоржийн Сэрдамба; April 18, 1985 (age 41) Mongolia
- Height: 164 cm (5 ft 5 in)

Sport
- Country: Mongolia
- Sport: Boxing
- Weight class: Light flyweight (48 kg)

Achievements and titles
- Olympic finals: (silver) (2008)
- World finals: (gold) (2009) (bronze) (2011)
- Regional finals: (gold) (2007)
Medal record
Men's amateur boxing
Representing Mongolia
Olympic Games
Silver medal – second place	2008 Beijing	Light Flyweight
World Championships
Gold medal – first place	2009 Milan	Light flyweight
Bronze medal – third place	2011 Baku	Light flyweight
Asian Championships
Gold medal – first place	2007 Ulaanbaatar	Light Flyweight
World University Championships
Gold medal – first place	2010 Ulaanbaatar	Light Flyweight
Bronze medal – third place	2006 Almaty	Light Flyweight
- Updated on 29 July 2012

Pürevdorjiin Serdamba (Mongolian: Пүрэвдоржийн Сэрдамба; born 18 April 1985) is a retired Mongolian amateur boxer. He won a silver medal at the 2008 Olympics in the junior flyweight division. He became the first Mongolian to win a gold medal at the World Amateur Boxing Championships in 2009.

== Career ==
Southpaw Serdamba lost his first bout at the 2007 World Championships to David Ayrapetyan 7:34. He won a gold medal at the 2009 World Amateur Boxing Championships held in Milan, Italy defeating David Ayrapetyan.

=== Olympic results ===
2008 (as a Light flyweight)

- Defeated Ronald Serugo (Uganda) 9–5
- Defeated Luis Yanez (United States) 8–7
- Defeated Amnat Ruanroeng (Thailand) 5–2
- Defeated Yampier Hernández (Cuba) 8-8 (countback tiebreaker)
- Lost to Zou Shiming (China) shoulder injury, score 0:1

2012 (as a Light flyweight)

- Lost to Devendro Singh (India), score 16:11

=== World Championship results ===
2009 (as a Light flyweight)

- Defeated Miroslav Kovach (Czech) 10–3
- Defeated Paulo Carvaho (Brazil) 5–2
- Defeated Hovhannes Danielyan (Armenia) 6–4
- Defeated Li Jiazhao (China) 11–7
- Defeated David Ayrapetyan (Russia) 10-5 World Champion
