= Patrick Lourenço =

Brazilian boxer

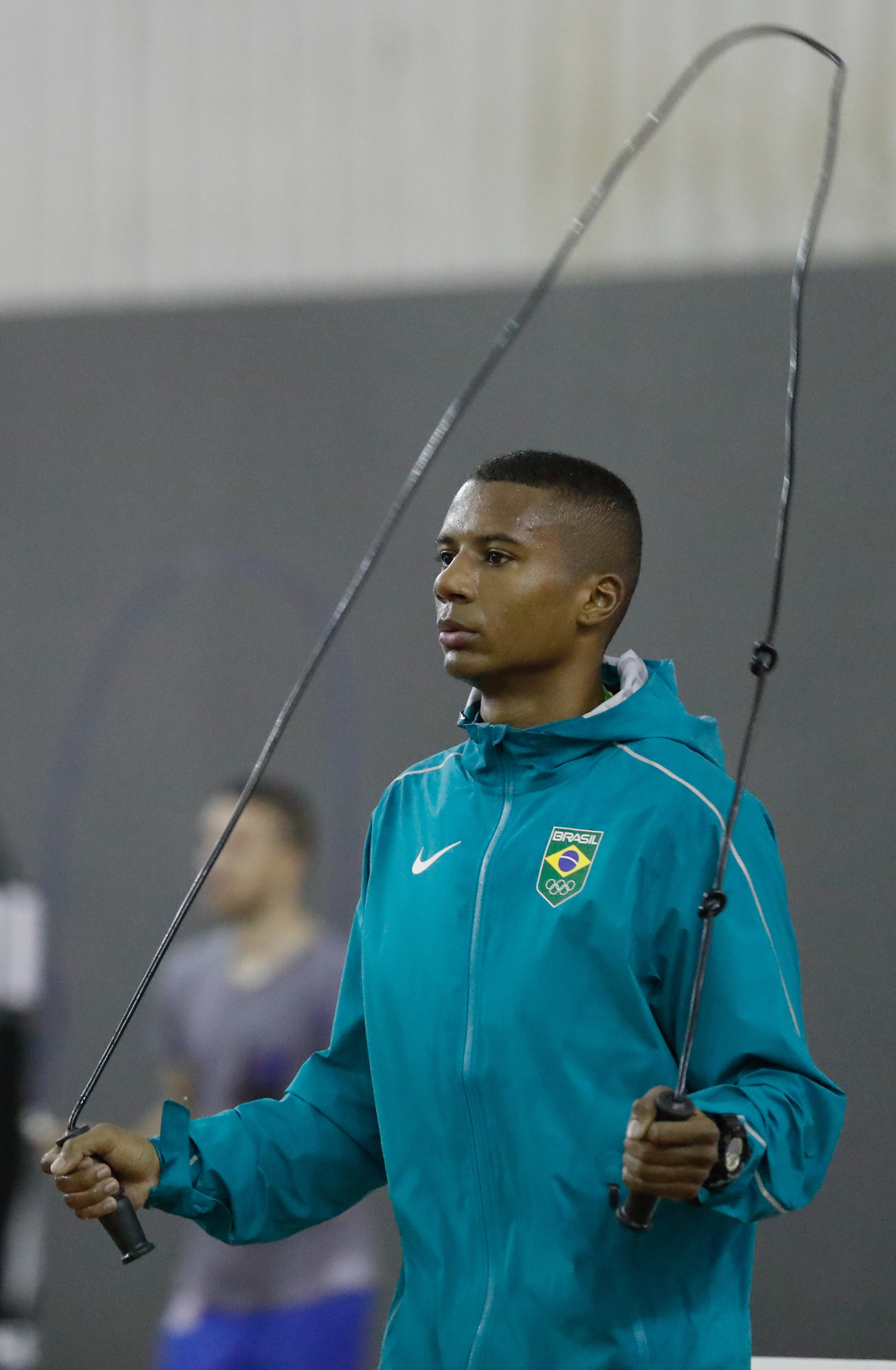
- Patrick Lourenço in 2016

Personal information
- Born: 2 July 1993 (age 33) Rio de Janeiro, Brazil
- Height: 164 cm (5 ft 5 in)

Sport
- Sport: Boxing
- Club: CBBoxe
- Coached by: Cláudio Aires; João Carlos Barros

Patrick Chagas Valério Lourenço (born 2 July 1993) is a Brazilian amateur boxer. He reached the quarterfinals at the 2013 World Championships and qualified for the 2016 Summer Olympics.
