= 2008 AIBA Youth World Boxing Championships =

Boxing competitions

Coordinates: 20°38′40″N 103°22′08″W

The 2008 AIBA Youth World Boxing Championships were held in Guadalajara, Mexico, from October 31 to November 1, 2008. It was the first edition of the AIBA Youth World Boxing Championships which had taken over from the Junior World Championship. The competition is under the supervision of the world's governing body for amateur boxing AIBA and is the junior version of the World Amateur Boxing Championships.

A total of 359 fighters from 68 different countries registered to compete in the inaugural edition of the competition.

== Medal winners ==
Event	Gold	Silver	Bronze
Light Flyweight (– 48 kilograms)	Nanao Singh; India	Grigoriy Nikolaychuk; Russia	Luis Diaz; Dominican Republic Jeremy Beccu; France
Flyweight (– 51 kilograms)	Jonathan González; Puerto Rico	Yunier Robles Gongora; Cuba	Bunyodbek Mashrapov; Uzbekistan (United States) Adam Lopez; USA
Bantamweight (– 54 kilograms)	Magomed Kurbanov; Russia	Andrei Razvan; Romania	Timacoy Williams; Australia Matti Koota; Finland
Featherweight (– 57 kilograms)	Óscar Valdez; Mexico	Maxim Dadashev; Russia	Marin Dragos; Romania Oleg Sheffer; Ukraine
Lightweight (– 60 kilograms)	(Republic of Ireland) Raymond Moylette; Ireland	Daniyar Yeleussinov; Kazakhstan	Vage Saruhanyan; Russia Alexey Haletsich; Belarus
Light Welterweight (– 64 kilograms)	Frank Isla; Cuba	(Republic of Ireland) Jamie Kavanagh; Ireland	Zdenek Chladek; Czech Republic Uktamjon Rahmonov; Uzbekistan
Welterweight (– 69 kilograms)	Óscar Molina; Mexico	Botirjon Makhmudov; Uzbekistan	(Republic of Ireland) David Joe Joyce; Ireland Sadulai Abdulai; Germany
Middleweight (– 75 kilograms)	Rey Eduardo Recio; Cuba	Enrico Koelling; Germany	Dmitry Bivol; Russia (United States) Luis Arias; USA
Light Heavyweight (– 81 kilograms)	Jose Larduet; Cuba	Marten Magomedov; Russia	(Republic of Ireland) Tommy McCarthy; Ireland Gianluca Rosciglione; Italy
Heavyweight (– 91 kilograms)	Erislandy Savón; Cuba	Ivan Dychko; Kazakhstan	Aurel Manole; Romania Marcin Siwy; Poland
Super Heavyweight (+ 91 kilograms)	(United States) Joseph Dawejko; USA	Eric Brechlin; Germany	Omar Ibanez; Cuba Egor Plevako; Ukraine

== Medal table ==
Rank	Nation	Gold	Silver	Bronze	Total
1	Cuba (CUB)	4	1	1	6
2	Mexico (MEX)	2	0	0	2
3	Russia (RUS)	1	3	2	6
4	Ireland (IRL)	1	1	2	4
5	United States (USA)	1	0	2	3
6	India (IND)	1	0	0	1
6	Puerto Rico (PUR)	1	0	0	1
8	Germany (GER)	0	2	1	3
9	Kazakhstan (KAZ)	0	2	0	2
10	Romania (ROU)	0	1	2	3
10	Uzbekistan (UZB)	0	1	2	3
12	Ukraine (UKR)	0	0	2	2
13	Australia (AUS)	0	0	1	1
13	Belgium (BEL)	0	0	1	1
13	Czech Republic (CZE)	0	0	1	1
13	Dominican Republic (DOM)	0	0	1	1
13	Finland (FIN)	0	0	1	1
13	France (FRA)	0	0	1	1
13	Italy (ITA)	0	0	1	1
13	Poland (POL)	0	0	1	1
Totals (20 entries)		11	11	22	44

== See also ==
- World Amateur Boxing Championships
