= Ramy Helmy El-Awadi =

Egyptian boxer (born 1989)

Ramy Helmy El-Awady (born 31 July 1989 in Sharkia) is an Egyptian amateur boxer who competed at the 2012 Olympics at light flyweight. He fights from an orthodox stance.

At the 2011 World Amateur Boxing Championships, he reached the second round, beating Alvaro Vargas 16–11.

He qualified for the 2012 Olympics by reaching the last 8 at the 2012 African Boxing Olympic Qualification Tournament.

== Boxing career ==
His achievements include:

Boxing for Egypt since 2007, including training camps in Lebanon, 2009, Cuba, 2011 and Ukraine, 2012.

At regional level he won gold medals at the Egyptian championships in 2007, 2008, 2009, 2010, 2011, 2012 and 2013. He won the Cairo Championship from 2007 to 2013.

Egyptian national team tests Since ( 2007 ) To ( 2013 ) (( 1st place ))

Future international university championship Cairo ( 2014 ) (( GOLD MEDAL ))

He won the Egyptian Universities Championship in 2013 and 2014.

At international level he won the 2007 Arab Championship for Youth (2007) in Egypt, and bronze at the 2007 Pan-Arab Games. In 2008 he won a bronze medal at the Africa Cup in Mauritius. He reached 5th place in both the Arabic Boxing Championships and the Francophone Games in 2009.

Egyptian International Championship 11th Egypt 2009 (( BRONZE MEDAL ))

Arab police clubs Syria (( GOLDEN CUP ))

In 2010, he won a bronze medal at the African Cup of Nations.

He competed at the 2011 World championship in Azerbaijan.

In 2012, he qualified for the Olympic Games by finishing in the last 8 of the African Qualifying tournament. To do this, he beat Japhet Uutoni of Namibia by knock out in his first match. At the London Olympic Games 2012 he lost his first match to Ferhat Pehlivan.

In 2013, he competed in the Istvan Bocskai Memorial in Hungary, beating Istvan Lakatos, before losing to Belik Galanov in the quarter-finals. At the Algerian International Championships, he won a silver medal, losing to Mohamed Flissi in the final. He also won a bronze medal at the 2013 Mediterranean Games in Turkey, losing to Pehlivan again in his semi-final. That year, he also competed in the Summer Universiade. At the 38th Golden Belt tournament in Romania, he won the bronze medal.

leader birthday championship 2016 Jordan (( BRONZE MEDAL ))
