= Juliano Máquina =

Mozambican boxer (born 1993)

Juliano Fernando Gento Máquina (born 18 August 1993 in Maputo) is a Mozambican boxer. He competed in the Men's light flyweight event at the 2012 Summer Olympics but lost in the first round to Aleksandar Aleksandrov.
