= Aleksandar Aleksandrov (boxer) =

Bulgarian boxer (born 1984)

Aleksandar Aleksandrov Александър Александров
Personal information
- Born: Aleksandar Aleksandrov; October 31, 1984 (age 41) Sofia, Bulgaria
- Weight: Flyweight

Boxing career
- Stance: Orthodox

Boxing record
- Total fights: 1
- Wins: 0
- Win by KO: 0
- Losses: 1

Aleksandar Aleksandrov (b. October 31, 1984 - Sofia ) is a Bulgarian amateur boxer who fought at the 2012 Olympics at junior fly.

At the 2012 Summer Olympics he beat Juliano Máquina from Mozambique, then edged out Korean Shin Jong-Hun 15:14 but lost to Thai Kaeo Pongprayoon 10:16 in the quarter finals.

== Professional boxing record ==
1 fight	0 wins	1 loss
By decision	0	1

No.	Result	Record	Opponent	Type	Round, time	Date	Location	Notes
1	Loss	0–1	Rafael Lozano	PTS	8	18 Feb 2006	León, Spain	
