= David Jiménez (boxer) =

Costa Rican boxer

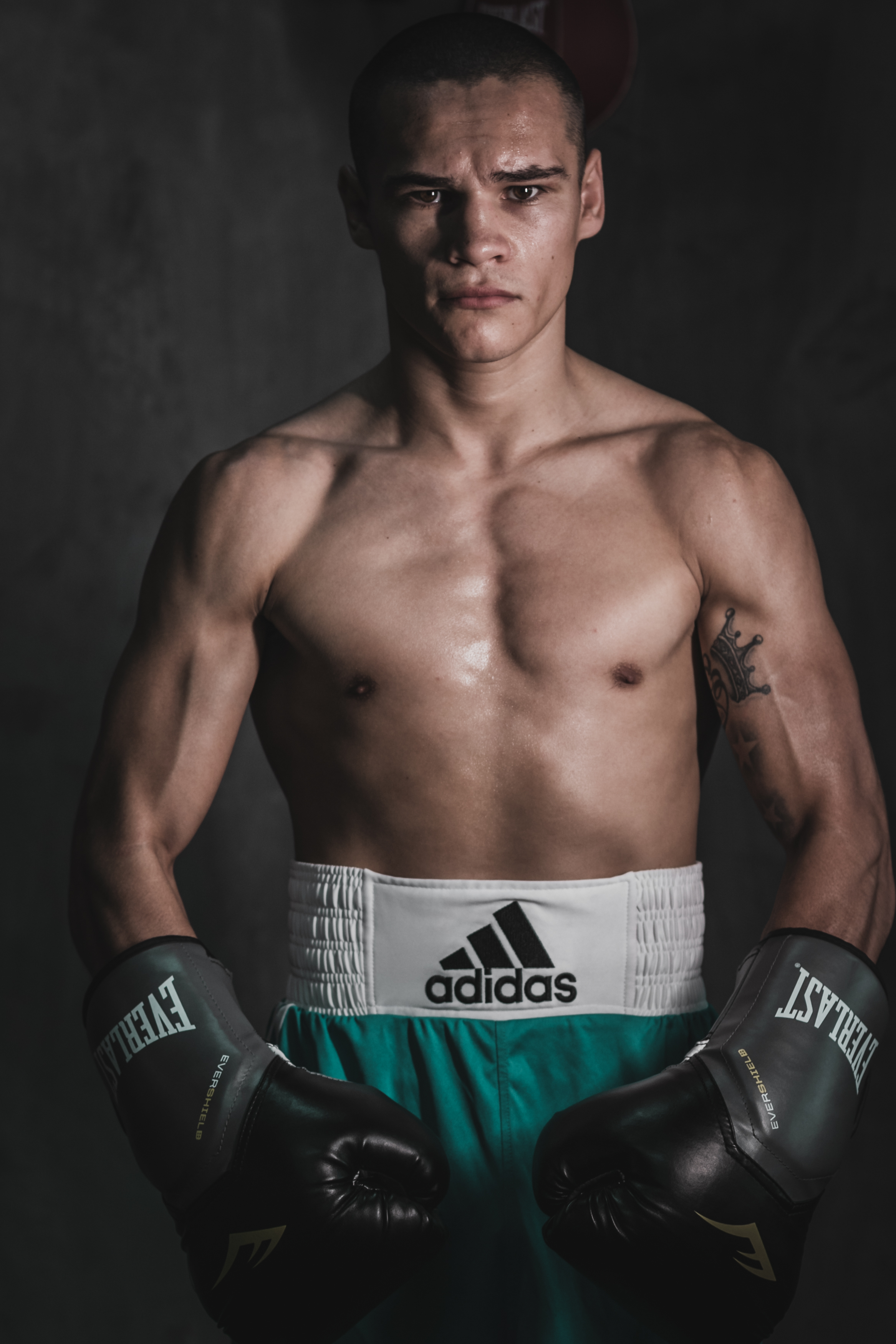

Personal information
- Nickname: Medallita ("Medal")
- Born: David Alejandro Jiménez Rodríguez; 15 April 1992 (age 34) Cartago, Costa Rica
- Height: 5 ft 4 1/2 in (164 cm)
- Weight: Flyweight; Super-flyweight

Boxing career
- Reach: 64 in (163 cm)
- Stance: Orthodox

Boxing record
- Total fights: 19
- Wins: 18
- Win by KO: 12
- Losses: 1
Medal record
Men's Amateur boxing
Representing Costa Rica
World Amateur Championships
Bronze medal – third place	2013 Almaty	Light flyweight
Pan American Games
Bronze medal – third place	2015 Toronto	Flyweight

David Alejandro Jiménez Rodríguez (born 15 April 1992) is a Costa Rican professional boxer. He has held the World Boxing Association (WBA) super-flyweight title since June 2026.

As an amateur he won bronze medals in the light flyweight event at the 2013 World Championships as well as the 2015 Pan American Games in the flyweight event.

== Professional boxing career ==
Jiménez made his professional debut against Emmanuel Villamar on 16 February 2019, and won the fight by a third-round knockout. He amassed a 7-0 record during the next eight months, winning all but one of those fights by way of stoppage.

Jiménez was scheduled to fight Jerson Ortiz for the vacant WBC Latino flyweight title on 18 February 2021, at the Hotel El Panama in Panama City. Jiménez had a poor start to the fight, as he was knocked down in the second round, but nonetheless won the fight by unanimous decision, with all three judges scoring the fight 98-90 in his favor.

Jiménez was scheduled to face Edwin Cano for the vacant WBA Gold World flyweight title on 19 June 2021, four months after winning his first professional title. Jiménez won the fight by a third-round knockout. Jiménez was booked to face Darwin Martinez on 17 March 2022, at the Hotel Barcelo San Jose Palacio in San Jose. He won the fight by a fifth-round knockout.

Jiménez was booked to face Ricardo Rafael Sandoval in a WBA flyweight title eliminator on 16 July 2022, on the Ryan Garcia and Javier Fortuna undercard. He won the fight by majority decision. Two of the judges scored the bout 114–112 in his favor, while the third judge scored the bout as an even 113–113 draw. Jiménez knocked Sandoval down in the eleventh round and was deducted a point in the seventh round for holding and hitting.

On August 1, 2022, the WBA formally ordered their reigning flyweight champion Artem Dalakian to make a mandatory title defense against Jiménez. On November 20, it was revealed that they had reached an agreement for the bout to take place in late January 2023. The fight took place on January 28, 2023, at the OVO Arena Wembley in London, England, on the undercard of the Artur Beterbiev and Anthony Yarde unified light heavyweight title bout. Jiménez lost the fight by unanimous decision, with two scorecards of 115–113 and one scorecard of 116–112.

Jiménez faced Rosendo Guarneros for the vacant WBC Latino flyweight title on July 21, 2023. He won the fight by a seventh-round stoppage, as Guarneros opted to retire from the bout at the end of the round.

On April 20, 2024 at Barclays Center in Brooklyn, New York, Jimenez defeated John Ramirez by unanimous decision and secured the WBA interim super-flyweight title.

On June 13, 2026, the WBA promoted Jimenez to regular champion after Jesse Rodriguez vacated the belt to move up to the bantamweight division.

== Professional boxing record ==
19 fights	18 wins	1 loss
By knockout	12	0
By decision	6	1

No.	Result	Record	Opponent	Type	Round, time	Date	Location	Notes
19	Win	18–1	Kenbun Torres	KO	11 (12), 1:12	20 Jul 2025	Bishkek Arena, Bishkek, Kyrgyzstan	Retained WBA interim super-flyweight title
18	Win	17–1	Keyvin Lara	UD	12	7 Mar 2025	Polideportivo de Cartago, Cartago, Costa Rica	Retained WBA interim super-flyweight title
17	Win	16–1	John Ramirez	UD	12	20 Apr 2024	Barclays Center, Brooklyn, New York, U.S.	Won vacant WBA interim super-flyweight title
16	Win	15–1	Pablo Macario	UD	10	23 Feb 2024	Parque de la Industria, Guatemala City, Guatemala	
15	Win	14–1	Ganigan López	KO	7 (8), 3:26	19 Jan 2024	Redondel De Toros Palmares, Alajuela, Costa Rica	
14	Win	13–1	Rosendo Guarneros	RTD	7 (12), 3:00	21 Jul 2023	Centro Eventos Campo Lago, San José, Costa Rica	Won vacant WBC Latino flyweight title
13	Loss	12–1	Artem Dalakian	UD	12	28 Jan 2023	OVO Arena Wembley, London, United Kingdom	For WBA flyweight title
11	Win	12–0	Ricardo Rafael Sandoval	MD	12	16 Jul 2022	Crypto.com Arena, Los Angeles, California, U.S.	
11	Win	11–0	Daniel Mendoza	TKO	5 (8), 0:30	5 Jun 2022	Hotel Barcelo San Jose Palacio, San José, Costa Rica	
10	Win	10–0	Darwin Martinez	KO	5 (8), 1:52	17 Mar 2022	Hotel Barcelo San Jose Palacio, San José, Costa Rica	
9	Win	9–0	Edwin Cano	KO	3 (10), 2:49	19 Jun 2021	Gimnasio Fight Club, San José, Costa Rica	Won vacant WBA Gold World flyweight title
8	Win	8–0	Jerson Ortiz	UD	10	18 Feb 2021	Hotel El Panama, Panama City, Panama	Won vacant WBC Latino flyweight title
7	Win	7–0	Jonathan Arias	UD	6	8 Feb 2020	Hotel El Panama, Panama City, Panama	
6	Win	6–0	Mayron Rostran	TKO	5 (6), 0:46	21 Dec 2019	Gimnasio Fight Club, San José, Costa Rica	
5	Win	5–0	Jesús Santos	RTD	4 (6), 3:00	27 Nov 2019	Centro de Convenciones, Panama City, Panama	
4	Win	4–0	Yader Toledo	KO	2 (4), 1:18	9 Nov 2019	BN Arena, San José, Costa Rica	
3	Win	3–0	Marcos Arrieta	KO	3 (4), 1:57	11 Sep 2019	Centro de Convenciones, Panama City, Panama	
2	Win	2–0	Edwin Javier Ortiz	TKO	3 (4), 1:48	8 Jun 2019	Ciudad Deportiva Desamparados, San José, Costa Rica	
1	Win	1–0	Emmanuel Villamar	KO	3 (4), 0:22	16 Feb 2019	Parque Las Ruinas, Cartago, Costa Rica	

== See also ==
- List of male boxers
- List of world super-flyweight boxing champions

Sporting positions
Regional boxing titles
Vacant Title last held by Jorge Orozco	WBC Latino flyweight champion February 18, 2021 – 2022; Vacated	Vacant Title next held by Yuberjen Martínez
New title	WBA Gold flyweight champion September 3, 2022 – April 20, 2024; Won interim title	Vacant
Vacant Title last held by Yuberjen Martínez	WBC Latino flyweight champion July 21, 2023 – April 20, 2024; Won interim title	Vacant
World boxing titles
Vacant Title last held by Andrew Moloney	WBA super-flyweight champion Interim title April 20, 2024 – June 13, 2026; Promoted	Vacant
Preceded by Jesse Rodriguez; Vacated	WBA super-flyweight champion June 13, 2026 – present	Incumbent
