= Carlos Quipo =

Ecuadorian boxer

Personal information
- Born: Carlos Eduardo Quipo Pilataxi; May 17, 1990 (age 36) Baeza, Ecuador
- Height: 5 ft 3 in (160 cm)
- Weight: Light flyweight

Boxing career
- Stance: Orthodox

Boxing record
- Total fights: 52
- Wins: 26
- Win by KO: 0
- Losses: 26
Medal record
Men's amateur boxing
Representing Ecuador
Pan American Championship
Bronze medal – third place	2017 Tegucigalpa	Light flyweight

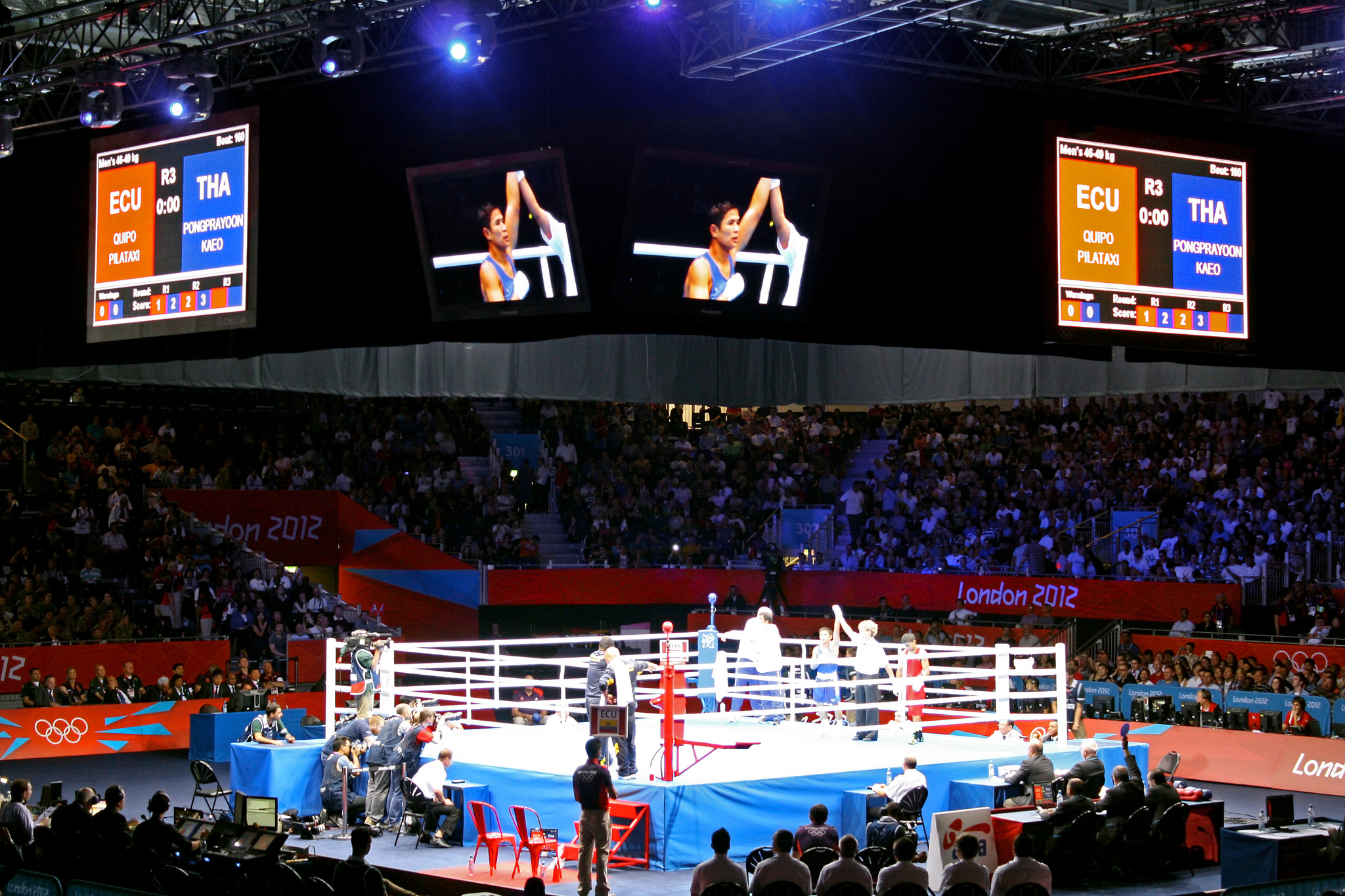

Carlos Quipo Pilataxi (born May 17, 1990, Quijos) is an Ecuador amateur boxer who competed at the 2012 and 2016 Olympics in the men's light flyweight event.

At the 2011 World Amateur Boxing Championships he defeated Ferhat Pehlivan (TUR) but lost to Devendro Singh (IND).

At the 2011 Pan American Games he lost his first bout to Juan Medina Herrad.

At the Olympic qualifier he upset PanAm champion Joselito Velázquez (MEX) in the semifinals and qualified for the Olympics. At the 2012 Olympics he beat José Kelvin de la Nieve but lost to Kaeo Pongprayoon.

Quipo qualified for the 2016 Olympics through his performance at the 2016 APB and WSB Olympic Qualifier. At the 2016 Olympic Games he reached the quarterfinals, beating Gankhuyagiin Gan-Erdene before losing to Nico Hernandez.
