= Atthaphon Daengchanthuek =

Thai weightlifter (born 1990)

Atthaphon Daengchanthuek (born 19 December 1990) is a Thai weightlifter. He competed for Thailand at the 2012 Summer Olympics in the men's -69 kg division. He finished in 16th place.
