= Eros Correa =

American boxer

Personal information
- Nationality: American
- Born: January 13, 1993 (age 33) San Jose, California
- Height: 5 ft 5 in (165 cm)
- Weight: Bantamweight

Boxing career
- Reach: 66 in (168 cm)
- Stance: Orthodox

Boxing record
- Total fights: 15
- Wins: 14
- Win by KO: 9
- Losses: 1

Eros Correa (born January 13, 1993) is an American professional boxer, ranked #7 in the WBA, #13 in the IBF and #1 in the United States. As an amateur, he competed at the 2011 World Championships.

He was the number one rated amateur boxer at flyweight in the U.S. prior to his pro debut on March 28, 2017.

== Amateur career ==
Correa won the 2010 PAL Championships at the Oxnard Convention Center in Oxnard, California.
