= 2009 AIBA World Boxing Championships =

Boxing competitions

- Venue: Mediolanum Forum
- Location: Milan, Italy
- Start date: September 1, 2009
- End date: September 12, 2009

The 2009 AIBA World Boxing Championships were held in Milan, Italy, from September 1, 2009 to September 12, 2009, in the Mediolanum Forum. It was the biggest World Championships in AIBA history. The competition was under the supervision of the world's governing body for amateur boxing, the AIBA.

Originally, Cameroon, Trinidad and Tobago and Uzbekistan each expressed interest in hosting the championships. However, they did not submit a final application and were therefore withdrawn from the running. This left Italy and South Korea remaining, who were the final two countries in contention during the bidding process to host the 2009 championships. The city of Milan in Italy was then chosen to host the competition.

== Medal table ==
* Host nation (Italy)

Rank	Nation	Gold	Silver	Bronze	Total
1	Russia (RUS)	2	4	2	8
2	Italy (ITA)*	2	0	0	2
3	Cuba (CUB)	1	1	2	4
3	Uzbekistan (UZB)	1	1	2	4
5	Mongolia (MGL)	1	1	1	3
5	Ukraine (UKR)	1	1	1	3
7	Puerto Rico (PUR)	1	1	0	2
8	Germany (GER)	1	0	1	2
9	Bulgaria (BUL)	1	0	0	1
10	Armenia (ARM)	0	1	0	1
10	United States (USA)	0	1	0	1
12	China (CHN)	0	0	2	2
12	France (FRA)	0	0	2	2
14	Belarus (BLR)	0	0	1	1
14	Georgia (GEO)	0	0	1	1
14	Hungary (HUN)	0	0	1	1
14	India (IND)	0	0	1	1
14	Ireland (IRL)	0	0	1	1
14	Kazakhstan (KAZ)	0	0	1	1
14	Mexico (MEX)	0	0	1	1
14	South Korea (KOR)	0	0	1	1
14	Venezuela (VEN)	0	0	1	1
Totals (22 entries)		11	11	22	44

== Medal summary ==
Event	Gold	Silver	Bronze
Light flyweight	Serdamba Purevdorj (MGL)	David Ayrapetyan (RUS)	Li Jiazhao (CHN)
Light flyweight	Serdamba Purevdorj (MGL)	David Ayrapetyan (RUS)	Shin Jong-Hun (KOR)
Flyweight	McWilliams Arroyo (PUR)	Tugstsogt Nyambayar (MGL)	Ronny Beblik (GER)
Flyweight	McWilliams Arroyo (PUR)	Tugstsogt Nyambayar (MGL)	Misha Aloyan (RUS)
Bantamweight	Detelin Dalakliev (BUL)	Eduard Abzalimov (RUS)	Yankiel León Alarcón (CUB)
Bantamweight	Detelin Dalakliev (BUL)	Eduard Abzalimov (RUS)	John Nevin (IRL)
Featherweight	Vasyl Lomachenko (UKR)	Sergey Vodopyanov (RUS)	Óscar Valdez (MEX)
Featherweight	Vasyl Lomachenko (UKR)	Sergey Vodopyanov (RUS)	Bahodirjon Sultonov (UZB)
Lightweight	Domenico Valentino (ITA)	José Pedraza (PUR)	Koba Pkhakadze (GEO)
Lightweight	Domenico Valentino (ITA)	José Pedraza (PUR)	Albert Selimov (RUS)
Light welterweight	Roniel Iglesias (CUB)	Frankie Gomez (USA)	Uranchimegiin Mönkh (MGL)
Light welterweight	Roniel Iglesias (CUB)	Frankie Gomez (USA)	Gyula Káté (HUN)
Welterweight	Jack Culcay-Keth (GER)	Andrey Zamkovoy (RUS)	Botirjon Makhmudov (UZB)
Welterweight	Jack Culcay-Keth (GER)	Andrey Zamkovoy (RUS)	Serik Sapiyev (KAZ)
Middleweight	Abbos Atoev (UZB)	Andranik Hakobyan (ARM)	Vijender Singh (IND)
Middleweight	Abbos Atoev (UZB)	Andranik Hakobyan (ARM)	Alfonso Blanco (VEN)
Light heavyweight	Artur Beterbiyev (RUS)	Elshod Rasulov (UZB)	José Larduet (CUB)
Light heavyweight	Artur Beterbiyev (RUS)	Elshod Rasulov (UZB)	Abdelkader Bouhenia (FRA)
Heavyweight	Egor Mekhontsev (RUS)	Osmai Acosta (CUB)	John M'Bumba (FRA)
Heavyweight	Egor Mekhontsev (RUS)	Osmai Acosta (CUB)	Oleksandr Usyk (UKR)
Super heavyweight	Roberto Cammarelle (ITA)	Roman Kapitanenko (UKR)	Viktar Zuyeu (BLR)
Super heavyweight	Roberto Cammarelle (ITA)	Roman Kapitanenko (UKR)	Zhang Zhilei (CHN)

== See also ==
- World Amateur Boxing Championships
