= Jérémy Beccu =

French boxer (born 1990)

Jeremy Beccu
Personal information
- Nationality: French
- Born: September 22, 1990 (age 35) Auchel, Pas-de-Calais, France
- Height: 5 ft 5 in (1.65 m)
- Weight: Bantamweight

Boxing career

Boxing record
- Total fights: 14
- Wins: 10
- Win by KO: 3
- Losses: 4
Medal record
Men's amateur boxing
Representing France
World Championships
Bronze medal – third place	2008 Guadalajara	Light-flyweight
Mediterranean Games
Gold medal – first place	2009 Pescara	Light-flyweight

Jérémy Beccu (born 22 September 1990) is a French professional boxer. As an amateur he represented France at the 2012 Olympics, reaching the first round of the light-flyweight bracket, where lost to Birzhan Zhakypov.

== Amateur career ==
Beccu won the French championship in his weight class in 2009, 2010 and 2011. He also won gold medals at the 2009 Mediterranean Games and the 2009 Jeux de la Francophonie as well as a bronze medal at the 2008 Youth World Amateur Boxing Championships.

== Professional boxing record ==
14 fights	10 wins	4 losses
By knockout	3	0
By decision	7	4

No.	Result	Record	Opponent	Type	Round, time	Date	Location	Notes
14	Loss	10–4	(France) Georges Ory	UD	10	19 May 2017	Parc des sports et loisir Alexis Vastine, Pont-Audemer, France	For vacant French bantamweight title
13	Loss	10–3	(France) Thomas Barbier	UD	8	25 Mar 2017	Complexe Sportif, Divion, France	
12	Loss	10–2	(France) Hassan Azaouagh	MD	10	5 Nov 2016	Espace Francois Mitterrand, Hénin-Beaumont, France	For vacant French bantamweight title
11	Win	10–1	(Nicaragua) Jose Aguilar	UD	8	14 May 2016	Complexe Sportif, Divion, France	
10	Win	9–1	(Serbia) Cristian Sujevic	UD	8	7 Nov 2015	Complexe Sportif, Divion, France	
9	Win	8–1	(France) Georges Ory	UD	8	6 Jun 2015	Complexe Sportif, Divion, France	
8	Loss	7–1	(France) Faycal Messaoudene	PTS	6	11 Apr 2015	Béthune, France	
7	Win	7–0	(Georgia (country)) Khvicha Gigolashvili	TKO	4 (8)	14 Mar 2015	Complexe Sportif, Divion, France	
6	Win	6–0	(France) Matthieu Russeau	TKO	3 (6)	13 Dec 2014	Salle COSEC, Pernes-en-Artois, France	
5	Win	5–0	(Serbia) Cristian Sujevic	UD	8	7 Jun 2014	Salle Leo Lagrange, Bruay-la-Buissière, France	
4	Win	4–0	(Georgia (country)) Irakli Jeiranashvili	UD	6	22 Feb 2014	Zénith, Caen, France	
3	Win	3–0	(France) Adel Hadjouis	PTS	6	7 Dec 2013	Bruay-la-Buissière, France	
2	Win	2–0	(France) Thomas Barbier	SD	6	8 Jun 2013	Salle CS Rostant, Bruay-la-Buissière, France	
1	Win	1–0	Jozef Torac	KO	1 (4), 1:06	9 Mar 2013	Herstal, Belgium	
