= Devendro Singh =

Indian boxer (born 1992)

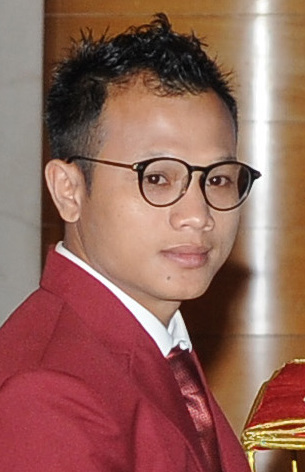
- Devendro Singh in 2017.

Personal information
- Full name: Devendro Singh Laishram
- Nationality: Indian
- Born: 2 March 1992 (age 34) Imphal West district, Manipur, India
- Occupation: Boxer light-flyweight

Sport
- Country: India
- Sport: Boxing
- Event: Light flyweight
- Coached by: M.Narjit Singh; Sandhu Singh
Medal record
Men's boxing
Representing India
Commonwealth Games
| Silver medal – second place | 2014 Glasgow | Light flyweight |

Devendro Singh Laishram (born 2 March 1992), also known as Devendro Singh or Devendro Laishram, is an Indian boxer from Imphal West district, Manipur who competes in the light-flyweight division. Devendro represented India at the 2012 Summer Olympics and lost out in the quarter-finals in a tough bout against the eventual bronze medalist Irish boxer Paddy Barnes. Devendro qualified for the Olympics after reaching the quarter-finals of the 2011 World Amateur Boxing Championships in Baku. In 2013 Devendro won the silver medal at the Asian Confederation Boxing Championship. In August 2014 he won the silver medal at the 2014 Commonwealth Games. He competed in the final against Paddy Barnes, who represented Northern Ireland.

== Personal life ==
Devendro was born in Imphal West district, Manipur, India, to parents Jugindro Singh and Maklembi Devi. His sister, Laishram Sushila Devi, is a former international boxing champion. Sushila helps her brother with his training. India Today quoted him as saying: "I have a supportive family at home. My sister Sushila does the job of an analyst for me. She watches all my bouts and those of my prospective opponents on YouTube and helps me in strategising."

== Olympic qualification ==
Qualification for the boxing at the 2012 Summer Olympics was based on the World Series of Boxing (WSB) Individual Championships, 2011 World Amateur Boxing Championships and five Continental Olympic Qualifying Events. 92 places were reserved from World Amateur Boxing Championships, held in Baku, Azerbaijan from 22 September 2011 to 10 October 2011, from which the top 10 pugilists from different National Olympic Committees in each weight class qualified for the Games. He was coached by the Manipur State Boxing Coach M. Narjit Singh and Indian Boxing Coach Gurbaksh Singh Sandhu.

Devendro Singh participated in the World Amateur Boxing Championships. He was selected after his performance in the trials for the World Championships held in the Army Sports Institute. He defeated Asian Amateur Boxing Championships silver medallists Nanao Singh Thokchom and Amandeep Singh during the trials. Devendro earned the Olympic berth after reaching at the quarter-finals, where he lost to South Korean opponent Shin Jong-Hun by a points difference of 16 to 28. He was little known before the tournament and his achievement was unanticipated. For training and competitions Devendro Singh received continuous support from sports science faculty in Army Sports Institute.

== 2012 Summer Olympics ==
Devendro qualified for the quarter-finals after defeating the 2008 Beijing Olympics silver medalist Pürevdorjiin Serdamba 16–11. He then faced Paddy Barnes of Ireland, winner of the bronze at the 2008 Olympics; Devendro lost 23–18 against Barnes and was knocked out of the Olympics on 8 August 2012.

== 2013 ==
Devendro won silver in the ASBC Asian Confederation Boxing Championship and further added a bronze to his tally during the FXTM International Limassol Boxing Cup. Devendro Singh is currently ranked World No. 3 by the International Boxing Association.

== 2014 ==
In February, Devendro won a gold at the Bocskai Invitation Tournament in Hungary. He was the only gold medalist for India in the tournament.

Devendro was presented with Vishisht Seva Medal for distinguished service at an investiture ceremony at the Eastern Army headquarters. He was the youngest and only Junior Commissioned Officer among the eight who received it.

He won the silver medal in the Men's Light Flyweight category boxing of the Glasgow Commonwealth Games 2014, losing to Paddy Barnes of Northern Ireland, despite winning the third round as he had already lost the first two rounds. 17 boxers from 17 nations took part in the tournament.
