= Hovhannes Danielyan =

Armenian boxer

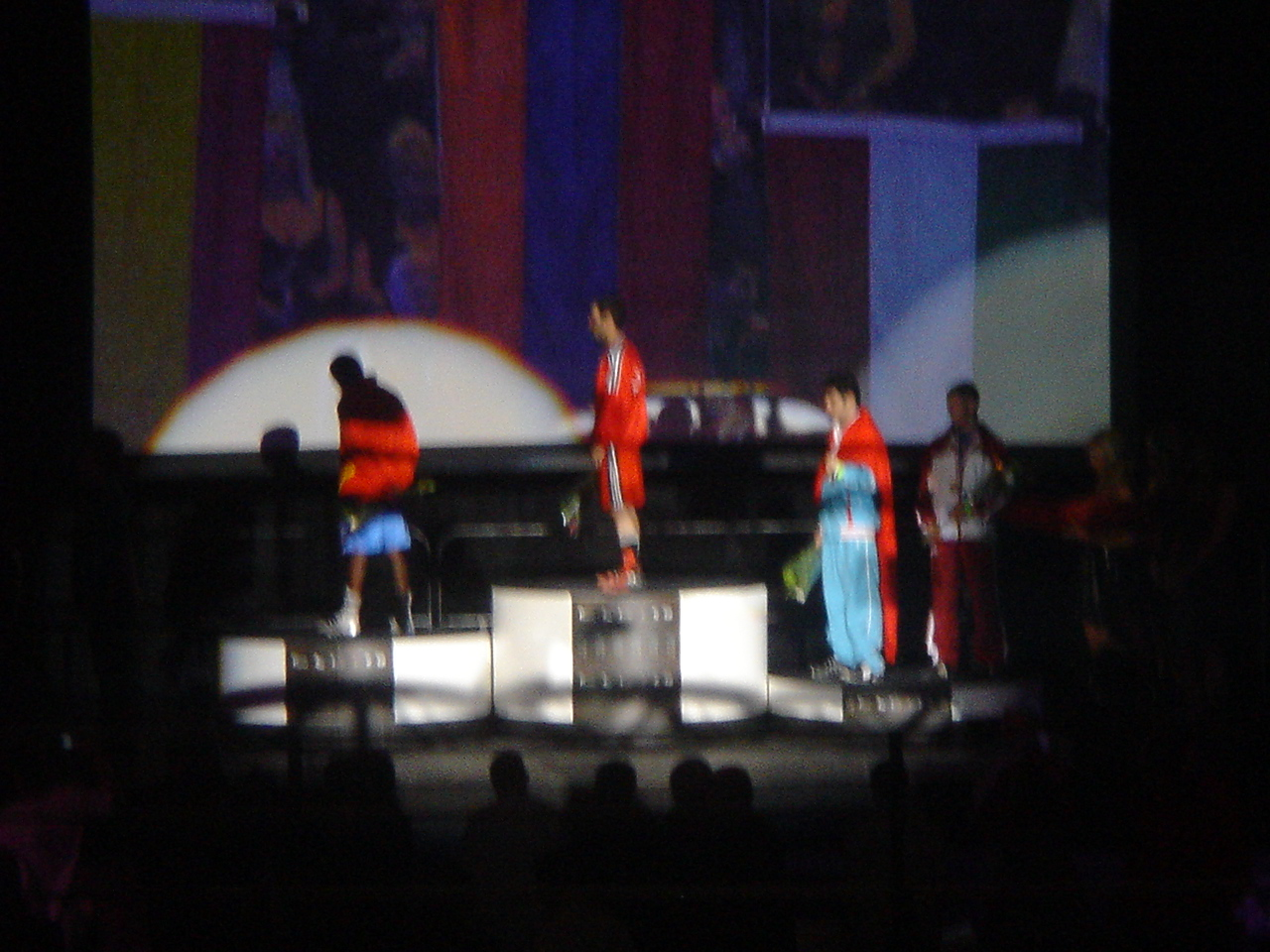

Personal information
- Born: April 11, 1987 (age 39) Armenian SSR

Sport
- Event: Light flyweight
Medal record
Men's Boxing
Representing Armenia
European Amateur Championships
Gold medal – first place	2008 Liverpool	Light Flyweight
Bronze medal – third place	2006 Plovdiv	Light Flyweight
Bronze medal – third place	2010 Moscow	Light Flyweight

Hovhannes Danielyan (Armenian: Հովհաննես Դանիելյան, born April 11, 1987, in Armenian SSR) is an Armenian light flyweight amateur boxer. He is a European Champion and Olympian.

== Career ==
Danielyan won a bronze medal at the 2004 Junior World Amateur Boxing Championships in Jeju. Danielyan won a bronze medal at the 2006 European Amateur Boxing Championships in Plovdiv. He reached the quarterfinals of the 2007 World Amateur Boxing Championships, and thus qualified for the upcoming Olympics. At the 2008 Summer Olympics, Danielyan beat Thomas Essomba in the first round before, but lost to Birzhan Zhakypov in the following round. Danielyan won a gold medal at the 2008 European Amateur Boxing Championships in Liverpool. He defeated Jose de la Nieve Linares in the finals. Danielyan, along with Eduard Hambardzumyan, became the first boxers from the independent Armenia to become European Champions. He also won a bronze medal at the 2010 European Amateur Boxing Championships in Moscow. Danielyan became an Armenian Champion in 2010 and 2012.
