= Ferhat Pehlivan =

Turkish boxer (born 1988)

Personal information
- Nationality: Turkish
- Born: August 20, 1988 (age 38) Akçaabat, Trabzon Province, Turkey
- Height: 1.68 m (5 ft 6 in)
- Weight: 49 kg (108 lb)

Sport
- Country: Turkey
- Sport: Amateur boxing
- Event: Light-flyweight
- Club: Fenerbahçe Boxing
- Coached by: Altar Kalkışım
Medal record
European Amateur Championships
Bronze medal – third place	2008 Liverpool	Light-flyweight
Mediterranean Games
Silver medal – second place	2013 Mersin	Light-flyweight
Bronze medal – third place	2009 Pescara	Light-flyweight
World University Championships
Bronze medal – third place	2008 Kazan	Light-flyweight
Bronze medal – third place	2010 Ulaanbaatar	Light-flyweight

Ferhat Pehlivan (born August 20, 1988) is a Turkish amateur boxer competing in the light-flyweight division. The 1.68 m (5 ft 6 in) tall boxer at 49 kg (108 lb) was a member of the Karnet S.K. in Akçaabat, Trabzon before he transferred to Fenerbahçe Boxing. He is coached by Altar Kalkışım. He is a student at the Atatürk University in Erzurum.

He won the bronze medal at the 2008 European Amateur Championships held in Liverpool, United Kingdom.

Pehlivan qualified for participation at the 2012 Summer Olympics. At the 2012 Summer Olympics (results) he won two fights before being defeated by David Ayrapetyan. At the 2013 Mediterranean Games held in Mersin, Turkey, he won the silver medal.

== Achievements ==
2007

- National Championships in Bursa, Turkey – Gold

2008

- 37th European Amateur Championships in Liverpool, United Kingdom – Bronze
- 3rd World University Boxing Championship on September 21–28, 2008 in Kazan, Russia – Bronze

2009

- 16th Mediterranean Games in Pescara, Italy – Bronze

2010

- 4th World University Boxing Championship on October 4–10, 2010 in Ulaanbaatar, Mongolia – Bronze

2011

- Silk Road Tournament on March 9–13, 2011 in Baku, Azerbaijan – Gold
- Felix Stam Tournament in Warsaw, Poland – Gold
