= Birzhan Zhakypov =

Kazakhstani boxer (born 1984)

Personal information
- Nationality: Kazakhstan
- Born: Біржан Жақыпов; 7 July 1984 (age 42) South Kazakhstan Region, Kazakh SSR, Soviet Union
- Height: 1.67 m (5 ft 6 in)
- Weight: Light flyweight

Boxing career
Medal record
World Championships
| Gold medal – first place | 2013 Almaty | Light Flyweight |
| Bronze medal – third place | 2005 Mianyang | Light Flyweight |
Asian Games
| Silver medal – second place | 2010 Guangzhou | Light Flyweight |

Birzhan Zhakypov (born July 7, 1984) is an amateur boxer from Kazakhstan, best known for winning the light flyweight gold medal at the 2013 World Amateur Boxing Championship.

He qualified for the 2008 Olympics in Beijing, where he beat Pál Bedák and Hovhannes Danielyan before losing to top favorite from China Zou Shiming (4:9).

At the 2010 Asian Games he beat Shin Jong-Hun before losing in the final to Zou Shiming.

At the 2011 World Amateur Boxing Championships he lost his first fight to a Cuban. He later qualified for the 2012 Olympics in London, beating Jérémy Beccu and Mark Anthony Barriga before losing again to eventual gold medalist Zou Shiming.
