= Shin Jong-hun =

South Korean boxer (born 1989)

Personal information
- Nationality: Korean
- Born: May 5, 1989 (age 37) Seoul, South Korea
- Height: 1.68 m (5 ft 6 in)

Korean name
- Hangul: 신종훈
- RR: Sin Jonghun
- MR: Sin Chonghun

Sport
- Country: South Korea
- Sport: Boxing
- Event: Light flyweight
- Coached by: Lee Seungbae
Medal record
World Amateur Championships
Silver medal – second place	Baku 2011	Light Flyweight
Bronze medal – third place	Milan 2009	Light Flyweight
- Updated on 29 July 2012

Shin Jong-hun (born May 5, 1989) is a South Korean light flyweight amateur boxer.

== Career ==
Shin won the light flyweight bronze medal at the 2009 World Amateur Boxing Championships, which was his first international competition, defeating Cuban champion Daniel Matellon Ramos in the quarterfinals.

At the 2010 Asian Games he lost early 3:17 to Birzhan Zhakypov.

At 2011 World Amateur Boxing Championships he came back strong, however, to win silver, losing the final to superstar Zou Shiming. He hereby qualified for the Olympics. At the 2012 Summer Olympics, he lost his opening match to Aleksandar Aleksandrov.

Shin is currently boxing for the Seoul Metropolitan Government Boxing Club.

== Results ==
2009 World Championships

Event	Round	Result	Opponent	Score
Light Flyweight	First	bye		
Light Flyweight	Second	Win	(Chinese Taipei) Lu Chia Lun	9-1
Light Flyweight	Third	Win	(Uganda) Ronald Serugo	17-3
Light Flyweight	Quarterfinal	Win	(Cuba) Daniel Matellon Ramos	14-5
Light Flyweight	Semifinal	Loss	(Russia) David Ayrapetyan	1-9
