= Nanao Singh Thokchom =

Indian boxer

Thokchom Nanao Singh
Personal information
- Nationality: Indian
- Born: Thokchom Nanao Singh; 8 January 1991 (age 35) Khoijuman Maning Leikai (near Bishnupur), Manipur, India
- Weight: Light flyweight (48 kg)

Boxing career
Medal record
Men's boxing
Representing India
Commonwealth Youth Games
Gold medal – first place	2008 Pune	Light flyweight
AIBA Youth World Boxing Championships
Gold medal – first place	2008 Guadalajara	Light flyweight
Asian Amateur Boxing Championships
Silver medal – second place	2009 Zhuhai	Light flyweight

Thokchom Nanao Singh (born 8 January 1991) is an Indian boxer from Khoijuman Maning Leikai village in Bishnupur district of Manipur. He trains at Pune-based Army Sports Institute and is supported by Olympic Gold Quest, a not-for-profit foundation to identify and support Indian athletes.

== Early years ==
Thokchom Nanao Singh was born to Thokchom Tobobi Singh and Keinahanbi Devi in Khoijuman Maning Leikai village (35 kilometres (22 mi) from Imphal) in Bishnupur district of Manipur. He took interest in boxing since the age of eight. His interest in the sport was spurred on by his friend, a boxer, who once took him to a boxing ring. Nanao Singh drew further inspiration from the success of Dingko Singh, a Manipur boxer who won a gold medal at the 1998 Asian Games, and Muhammad Ali. Being the youngest child in their family, his parents wanted him to focus on education instead of sport. When Nanao Singh first put on a pair of boxing gloves, his father got furious and sent him to a boarding school so that his focus could be redirected to education. Nanao Singh ran away from this school and returned home. After seeing his dedication to boxing, his father introduced him to a local boxing coach who groomed him initially. In 2000, Nanao Singh joined the Pune-based Army Sports Institute. He was the successful outcome of the institute's joint collaboration with the Sports Authority of India whose aim was to win international medals for India.

== Amateur career ==
Nanao Singh started out boxing in India by winning the sub-junior national championships consecutively in 2004, 2005 and 2006. In the years 2007 and 2008, he was the National Junior Champion.

Nanao Singh represented India in the 48-kg category at the 2007 Commonwealth Boxing Championships in Liverpool. He won a silver medal at this championship despite being a junior-level player. Based on this performance, the Indian national coach predicted Nanao Singh's success at the 2008 Commonwealth Youth Games. As per his coach's expectations, he won the gold medal at the Youth Games. A few weeks after this victory, Nanao Singh won the gold medal – the lone medalist for India – at the inaugural AIBA Youth World Boxing Championships that was held in Guadalajara, Mexico. In 2008, he also won the gold medal at the Juvenile Olympic Games that were held in Cuba. At the 2009 Asian Amateur Boxing Championships, he narrowly missed the gold medal in his category. The Indian coach was happy with the overall performance of the boxers and predicted a bright future for Nanao Singh. Following this win, he was ranked fifth with a tally of 1400 points.

At the 2009 AIBA World Boxing Championships, he was seeded second in the 48-kg category. However, Nanao Singh faltered in the second round itself where he lost by a single point. Owing to this poor result, he dropped three places to eighth in the light flyweight ranking. Towards the end of 2009, Nanao Singh represented Team Asia at the season-ending President's Cup, the only AIBA event.

At the 2010 season-opening Super Cup Boxing, Nanao Singh won the title in the 48-kg category. In the same year, the Asian Boxing Confederation organized an invitational prize event that was called as the Champion of Champions. Along with three other Indian boxers – Vijender Singh, Dinesh Kumar and Akhil Kumar – Nanao Singh represented his country in the two-day championship; he lost in the opening round itself. For the Commonwealth Boxing Championships, Nanao Singh failed to qualify because he had lost out to another boxer in the trials.

In January 2010, Nanao Singh injured his hand and this put him out of boxing. Due to this injury, he was unable to participate in the Indian National Championships. In June 2010, he underwent a surgery for his fractured arm.

Samsung chose a list of 10 Indian sports-persons as a part of Sports Ratna, a scholarship program with an aim to support players for the 2010 Asian Games. Nanao Singh was one among this list of four boxers, four shooters, and two wrestlers. Olympic Gold Quest, a not-for-profit foundation to identify and support Indian athletes, chose him because of his talent and bright future.
