= Kelvin de la Nieve =

Spanish boxer (born 1986)

José Kelvin de la Nieve
Personal information
- Born: José Kelvin de la Nieve Linares; 22 August 1986 (age 39) Los Alcarrizos, Dominican Republic
- Height: 1.63 m (5 ft 4 in)
- Weight: Light flyweight; Flyweight

Boxing career
Medal record
Representing Spain
Mediterranean Games
Gold medal – first place	2013 Mersin	Flyweight
Bronze medal – third place	2005 Almería	Light Flyweight
European Amateur Championships
Silver medal – second place	2008 Liverpool	Light Flyweight
Bronze medal – third place	2010 Moscow	Light Flyweight
Bronze medal – third place	2015 Samokov	Flyweight
EU Amateur Championships
Silver medal – second place	2007 Dublin	Light Flyweight

José Kelvin de la Nieve Linares (born 28 August 1986) is a boxer. Born in the Dominican Republic, he represents Spain internationally. He competed in the light flyweight weight class at the 2008 and 2012 Summer Olympics.

He became a Spanish citizen in 2000 and is based out of Huelva. He has been competing with the Club Deportivo Yoon. After failing to qualify for the 2004 Olympics, he won the bronze medal in the 2005 Mediterranean Games and was able to become the only boxer from Spain to box in Beijing. He lost his Olympic debut to American southpaw Luis Yanez 9:12.

De la Nieve won silver at the 2008 European Amateur Boxing Championships in Liverpool, England after he lost to Hovhannes Danielyan in the final.

At the 2010 European Amateur Boxing Championships in Moscow, Russia he won the bronze medal after he lost to Paddy Barnes from Ireland in the Semifinals.

He qualified for the 2012 Summer Olympics, but again lost in the first round, this time to Carlos Quipo of Ecuador.
