= David Ayrapetyan =

Russian boxer (born 1983)

Personal information
- Born: 26 September 1983 (age 42) Soviet Union
- Height: 1.58 m (5 ft 2 in)

Sport
- Country: Russia
- Sport: Boxing
- Event: Light flyweight
- Coached by: Valery Entaltsev; Alexander Artyomov
Medal record
Summer Olympics
Bronze medal – third place	2012 London	Light flyweight
World Amateur Championships
Silver medal – second place	2009 Milan	Light flyweight
Bronze medal – third place	2011 Baku	Light flyweight
European Amateur Championships
Gold medal – first place	2006 Plovdiv	Light flyweight
Gold medal – first place	2013 Minsk	Light flyweight

David Valeryevich Ayrapetyan (Armenian: Դավիդ Այրապետյանը, born 26 September 1983) is an Armenian-Russian amateur boxer. He is a six-time Champion of Russia, European Champion, World and Olympic medalist. Ayrapetyan was awarded the Honored Master of Sports of Russia title in 2009.

== Early life ==
David was born on 26 October 1983 in Baku, Azerbaijan SSR to an Armenian family. David received his name from his uncle, his fathers brother. His uncle was a wrestler and took David to his practices. After the beginning of the First Nagorno-Karabakh War and the subsequent Baku pogrom, the family was forced to move to Armenia and then later to Russia. They lived in Pyatigorsk for 13 years. The family rented a room in a four-storey apartment in which David's parents, brother and grandmother lived in.

In the fourth grade, David already knew some basics of combat from his uncle and once got into a fight with two classmates. He fought for what was right, but didn't win. When David came home, he scattered all of his school things around the house because he was angry. When his mother came home from work, he told her what's wrong, and she started crying and tried to clam him. His mother told him to go take revenge and he did. This is how everything started. Ayrapetyan started boxing when he was 13 years old under Valery Entaltseva. He graduated from North Caucasus State Technical University, Faculty of Law, Stavropol, Russia.

== Career ==
Ayrapetyan became the 2002 World Youth Champion in his weight class after boxing for just six years.

He was included in the Russian national boxing team in 2006 and won a gold medal at the 2006 European Amateur Boxing Championships in Plovdiv. Ayrapetyan is only the second Russian boxer to become a European Champion in the light flyweight division, after the highly decorated veteran Sergey Kazakov. In 2006 and 2007, Ayrapetyan beat Kazakov at the Russian Championships and took his spot on the national team as first in the light flyweight division. At the 2007 World Amateur Boxing Championships, Ayrapetyan beat returning Vice-Champion Pál Bedák in the first round but next lost to reigning World Champion Zou Shiming, who went on to win the World Championships again. Ayrapetyan competed at the 2008 Summer Olympics in Beijing. He unexpectedly lost in the first match to Georgiy Chygayev, who won the European Championship at flyweight that year and then moved down in weight class.

Ayrapetyan reached the finals at the 2009 World Amateur Boxing Championships in Milan and won the silver medal. He won a bronze medal at the 2011 World Amateur Boxing Championships after losing to now reigning World and Olympic Champion Shiming, who went on to win the World Championship yet again. Ayrapetyan advanced to the semifinals at the 2012 Summer Olympics and won an Olympic bronze medal.

== Awards ==
- Medal of the Order, For Services to the Fatherland, II degree (13 August 2012) - for outstanding contribution to the development of physical culture and sports, high achievements in sports at the 2012 Summer Olympics in London, United Kingdom.
