= Boxing at the 2008 Summer Olympics – Light flyweight =

Boxing competitions

The Light Flyweight class in the boxing at the 2008 Summer Olympics competition is the lightest class. Light flyweights were limited to those boxers weighing less than 48 kilograms (105.8 lbs).

29 boxers qualified for this category after the 2007 World Amateur Boxing Championships and 9 Continental Qualification Tournaments.

The only Olympic medalist to participate in the flyweight at the Beijing Games is the host country boxer, Zou Shiming, bronze at the 2004 Games and defending World Champion.

Like all Olympic boxing events, the competition was a straight single-elimination tournament. Both semifinal losers were awarded bronze medals, so no boxers competed again after their first loss. Bouts consisted of four rounds of two minutes each, with one-minute breaks between rounds. Punches scored only if the white area on the front of the glove made full contact with the front of the head or torso of the opponent. Five judges scored each bout; three of the judges had to signal a scoring punch within one second for the punch to score. The winner of the bout was the boxer who scored the most valid punches by the end of the bout.

== Medalists ==
Gold	Zou Shiming; China
Silver	Pürevdorjiin Serdamba; Mongolia
Bronze	Paddy Barnes; Ireland
Bronze	Yampier Hernández; Cuba

== Qualified Athletes ==
	Athlete	Country	Notes
1	Hovannas Danielyan	Armenia	2006 European Championships
2	Paulo Carvalho	Brazil	
3	Thomas Essomba	Cameroon	2007 All Africa Games
4	Zou Shiming	China	2005 World Championships; 2007 World Championships; 2006 Asian Games; 2003 World Championships; 2004 Athens Olympics
5	Yampier Hernández	Cuba	
6	Winston Méndez Montero	Dominican Republic	2007 Pan American Games
7	José Luis Meza	Ecuador	
8	Nordine Oubaali	France	2007 Worlds; 2007 EU Championships
9	Manyo Plange	Ghana	2007 All-Africa Games
10	Pál Bedák	Hungary	2005 Worlds
11	Paddy Barnes	Ireland	
12	Birzhan Zhakypov	Kazakhstan	2005 World Championships
13	Suleiman Bilali	Kenya	2003 All-Africa Games; 2007 All-Africa Games
14	Redouane Bouchtouk	Morocco	
15	Pürevdorjiin Serdamba	Mongolia	
16	Japhet Uutoni	Namibia	2006 Commonwealth Games
17	Jack Willie	Papua New Guinea	
18	Harry Tañamor	Philippines	2007 World Championships; 2002 Asian Games; 2001 World Championships; 2003 World Championships
19	Lukasz Maszczyk	Poland	
20	Dave Ayrapetyan	Russia	2006 European Championships
21	Kelvin de la Nieve	Spain	2007 EU Championships
22	Simanga Shiba	Swaziland	IOC Tripartite Commission Invitation
23	Sherali Dostiev	Tajikistan	2005 World Championships
24	Amnat Ruanroeng	Thailand	2007 World Championships
25	Ronald Serugo	Uganda	
26	Georgiy Chygayev	Ukraine	
27	Luis Yanez	United States	2007 Pan American Games
28	Rafikjon Sultonov	Uzbekistan	
29	Eduard Bermúdez	Venezuela	
29 Boxers

== Schedule ==
All times are China Standard Time (UTC+8)

Date	Time	Round
Wednesday, August 13, 2008	13:30-15:00; 19:00-20:30	Round of 32
Saturday, August 16, 2008	19:00-21:00	Round of 16
Tuesday, August 19, 2008	19:00-20:00	Quarterfinals
Friday, August 22, 2008	19:00-19:30	Semifinals
Sunday, August 24, 2008	13:30-13:45	Final Bout

== Draw ==
Round of 32
Łukasz Maszczyk (POL)	RSC
Saidu Kargbo (SLE)
Pál Bedák (HUN)	6
Birzhan Zhakypov (KAZ)	7
Thomas Essomba (CMR)	3
Hovhannes Danielyan (ARM)	9
Nordine Oubaali (FRA)	8
Rafikjon Sultonov (UZB)	7
Eduard Bermúdez (VEN)	2
Zou Shiming (CHN)	11
Winston Mendez Montero (DOM)	9
Suleiman Bilali (KEN)	3
Amnat Ruenroeng (THA)	14
Jack Willie (PNG)	2
Pürevdorjiin Serdamba (MGL)	9
Ronald Serugo (UGA)	5
Kelvin de la Nieve (ESP)	9
Luis Yáñez (USA)	12
Georgiy Chygayev (UKR)	13
David Ayrapetyan (RUS)	11
Yampier Hernández (CUB)	12
Sherali Dostiev (TJK)	1
Manyo Plange (GHA)	6
Harry Tañamor (PHI)	3
Redouane Bouchtouk (MAR)	7
Paulo Carvalho (BRA)	13

Round of 16
Paddy Barnes (IRL)	14
José Luis Meza (ECU)	8
Japhet Uutoni (NAM)	5
Łukasz Maszczyk (POL)	+5
Birzhan Zhakypov (KAZ)	13
Hovhannes Danielyan (ARM)	7
Nordine Oubaali (FRA)	3
Zou Shiming (CHN)	+3
Winston Mendez Montero (DOM)	3
Amnat Ruanroeng (THA)	7
Pürevdorjiin Serdamba (MGL)	8
Luis Yáñez (USA)	7
Georgiy Chygayev (UKR)	3
Yampier Hernández (CUB)	21
Manyo Plange (GHA)	12
Paulo Carvalho (BRA)	21

Quarterfinals
Paddy Barnes (IRL)	11
Łukasz Maszczyk (POL)	5
Birzhan Zhakypov (KAZ)	4
Zou Shiming (CHN)	9
Amnat Ruenroeng (THA)	2
Pürevdorjiin Serdamba (MGL)	5
Yampier Hernández (CUB)	21
Paulo Carvalho (BRA)	6

Semifinals
Paddy Barnes (IRL)	0
Zou Shiming (CHN)	15
Pürevdorjiin Serdamba (MGL)	+8
Yampier Hernández (CUB)	8

Final
Zou Shiming (CHN)
Pürevdorjiin Serdamba (MGL)	RET

== See also ==
- 2009 World Amateur Boxing Championships – Light flyweight
