= Boxing at the 2007 Pan American Games – Qualifier 1 =

The Men's Boxing Tournament at the 2007 Pan American Games was held in Rio de Janeiro, Brazil from July 20 to July 28. There were three qualifying events for the Boxing Tournament, with the first one held in Barquisimeto, Venezuela from February 2 to February 8, 2007.

== Light Flyweight (– 48 kg) ==
Quarterfinals
Yampier Hernández (CUB)	11
Luis Yáñez (USA)	10
Jorge Gudino (GUA)	BYE
Kevin Betancourt (VEN)	15
Oscar Negrete (COL)	7
Carlos Ortíz (PUR)	RSCO-2
Lucas Navarro (ARG)

Semifinals
Yampier Hernández (CUB)	RSC 4
Jorge Gudino (GUA)
Kevin Betancourt (VEN)	WO
Carlos Ortíz (PUR)

Finals
Yampier Hernández (CUB)	25
Kevin Betancourt (VEN)	10

== Flyweight (– 51 kg) ==
Quarterfinals		Semifinals		Finals
Eddy Valenzuela (GUA)	27
William Urina (COL)	17	Eddy Valenzuela (GUA)	7
Yoandri Salinas (CUB)	25	Yoandri Salinas (CUB)	13
Qa'id Muhammad (USA)	15			Yoandri Salinas (CUB)	21
Juan Vega (ECU)	12			Braulio Avila (MEX)	12
Carlos Narvaez (PUR)	8	Juan Vega (ECU)	6
Braulio Avila (MEX)	14	Braulio Avila (MEX)	17
Alexander Gueracuco (VEN)	6

== Bantamweight (– 54 kg) ==
Quarterfinals		Semifinals		Finals
Luis Moreira (ECU)	11
José Pantaleon (GUA)	18	José Pantaleon (GUA)	18
Héctor Manzanilla (VEN)	KO-2	Héctor Manzanilla (VEN)	35
Carlos Padilla (COL)	—			Héctor Manzanilla (VEN)	RSCO-3
Carlos Cuadras (MEX)	34			Roberto Marroquin (USA)	—
Jorge Díaz (PUR)	15	Carlos Cuadras (MEX)	23
Roberto Marroquin (USA)	RSC-2	Roberto Marroquin (USA)	26
Daniel Giordano (ARG)	—

== Lightweight (– 60 kg) ==
Quarterfinals		Semifinals		Finals
Yordenis Ugás (CUB)	19
Darleys Pérez (COL)	7	Yordenis Ugás (CUB)	27
Terence Crawford (USA)	16	Terence Crawford (USA)	10
Luis Rueda (ARG)	13			Yordenis Ugás (CUB)	17
Lisandro Bolivar (VEN)	13			Lisandro Bolivar (VEN)	7
Abraham Lopez (MEX)	6	Lisandro Bolivar (VEN)	16
José Pedraza (PUR)	20	José Pedraza (PUR)	8
Oscar Diaz (DOM)	15

== See also ==
- Pan American Games Qualifier 2 in Buenos Aires, Argentina from March 15 to March 20, 2007
- Pan American Games Qualifier 3 in Port of Spain, Trinidad from April 23 to April 28, 2007
