= 2009 World Amateur Boxing Championships – Flyweight =

Boxing competitions

The Flyweight competition was the second-lowest weight featured at the 2009 World Amateur Boxing Championships, and was held at the Mediolanum Forum. Flyweights were limited to a maximum of 51 kilograms in body mass.

== Medalists ==
Gold	McWilliams Arroyo; Puerto Rico
Silver	Tugstsogt Nyambayar; Mongolia
Bronze	Ronny Beblik; Germany
Bronze	Misha Aloyan; Russia

== Seeds ==
1. (Cuba) Yampier Hernández (quarterfinals)
2. (Italy) Vincenzo Picardi (quarterfinals)
3. (Thailand) Amnat Ruenroeng (quarterfinals)
4. (Cameroon) Thomas Essomba (first round)
5. (Puerto Rico) 'McWilliams Arroyo (champion)
6. (Mexico) Braulio Ávila (second round)
7. (North Macedonia) Mumin Veli (second round)
8. (England) Khalid Saeed Yafai (quarterfinals)

== Draw ==
=== Finals ===
Quarterfinals
Yampier Hernández (CUB)	2
McWilliams Arroyo (PUR)	6
Khalid Saeed Yafai (ENG)	3
Ronny Beblik (GER)	9
Amnat Ruenroeng (THA)	5
Misha Aloyan (RUS)	7
Tugstsogt Nyambayar (MGL)	12
Vincenzo Picardi (ITA)	7

Semifinals
McWilliams Arroyo (PUR)	9
Ronny Beblik (GER)	7
Misha Aloyan (RUS)	7
Tugstsogt Nyambayar (MGL)	8

Final
McWilliams Arroyo (PUR)	18
Tugstsogt Nyambayar (MGL)	2

=== Top half ===
==== Section 1 ====
Round 1

Round 2
Yampier Hernández (CUB)	14
Alexandr Riscan (MDA)	2
Nguyen Hai Van (VIE)	11
Benedict Telovae (SOL)	2
Norbert Kalucza (HUN)	20
Merab Turkadze (GEO)	15
Yoon Kyoung Min (KOR)
McWilliams Arroyo (PUR)	RSCH

Round 3
Yampier Hernández (CUB)	8
Nguyen Hai Van (VIE)	1
Norbert Kalucza (HUN)
McWilliams Arroyo (PUR)	RSC

Quarterfinals
Yampier Hernández (CUB)	2
McWilliams Arroyo (PUR)	6

==== Section 2 ====
Round 1
Oraz Avzalshoev (TJK)	7
Muhammad Waseem (PAK)	13
Aleksander Aleksandrov (BUL)	WO
Thomas Essomba (CMR)

Round 2
Khalid Saeed Yafai (ENG)	13
Erdal Inanli (TUR)	3
Olzhas Sattibayev (KAZ)	13
Nordine Oubaali (FRA)	8
Ronny Beblik (GER)	14
Bato-Munko Vankeyeu (BLR)	8
Muhammad Waseem (PAK)	0
Aleksander Aleksandrov (BUL)	2

Round 3
Khalid Saeed Yafai (ENG)	14
Olzhas Sattibayev (KAZ)	5
Ronny Beblik (GER)	5
Aleksander Aleksandrov (BUL)	3

Quarterfinals
Khalid Saeed Yafai (ENG)	3
Ronny Beblik (GER)	9

=== Bottom half ===
==== Section 3 ====
Round 1
Amnat Ruenroeng (THA)	8
Artem Dalakian (UKR)	6
Juan Payano Pichardo (DOM)	21
Francisco Torrijos Portillo (ESP)	6
Anu Michael (NGR)	11
Benson Gicharu (KEN)	10
Shahriyor Isakov (UZB)	18
Luis Caycho Davila (PER)	9
Azat Usenaliev (KGZ)	9
Derenik Gizhlaryan (ARM)	11
Yaya Runanga (BDI)	2
Misha Aloyan (RUS)	25
Yang Tsung Ju (TPE)	3
Eddie Valenzuela (GUA)	17
Louie Byrd (USA)	12
Braulio Ávila (MEX)	14

Round 2
Amnat Ruenroeng (THA)	+5
Juan Payano Pichardo (DOM)	5
Anu Michael (NGR)	2
Shahriyor Isakov (UZB)	17
Derenik Gizhlaryan (ARM)	5
Misha Aloyan (RUS)	11
Eddie Valenzuela (GUA)	13
Braulio Ávila (MEX)	7

Round 3
Amnat Ruenroeng (THA)	10
Shahriyor Isakov (UZB)	3
Misha Aloyan (RUS)	7
Eddie Valenzuela (GUA)	1

Quarterfinals
Amnat Ruenroeng (THA)	5
Misha Aloyan (RUS)	7

==== Section 4 ====
Round 1
Mumin Veli (MKD)	19
Julio Bria (INA)	9
Manyo Plange (GHA)	5
Declan Gerraghty (IRL)	12
Wanniarchchi Manju Dinesh (SRI)	5
Peter Senky (SVK)	13
Suranjoy Mayengbam (IND)	10
Tugstsogt Nyambayar (MGL)	+10
Oscar Negrete (COL)	19
Koffi Yoboue (CIV)	0
Hiroyuki Misu (JPN)	2
Li Chao (CHN)	18
Andrew Moloney (AUS)	4
Fernando Martínez (ARG)	21
Nihat Seyidov (AZE)	2
Vincenzo Picardi (ITA)	17

Round 2
Mumin Veli (MKD)	9
Declan Gerraghty (IRL)	11
Peter Senky (SVK)	7
Tugstsogt Nyambayar (MGL)	12
Oscar Negrete (COL)	9
Li Chao (CHN)	20
Fernando Martínez (ARG)	8
Vincenzo Picardi (ITA)	17

Round 3
Declan Gerraghty (IRL)	7
Tugstsogt Nyambayar (MGL)	17
Li Chao (CHN)	5
Vincenzo Picardi (ITA)	11

Quarterfinals
Tugstsogt Nyambayar (MGL)	12
Vincenzo Picardi (ITA)	7

== See also ==
- Boxing at the 2008 Summer Olympics – Flyweight
