= Boxing at the 2010 Commonwealth Games – Middleweight =

Boxing competitions

The Middleweight class in the boxing at the 2010 Commonwealth Games competition is a class. Middleweights were limited to those boxers weighing less than 75 kilograms (165 lb).

27 boxers competed.

Like all Olympic boxing events, the competition was a straight single-elimination tournament. Both semifinal losers were awarded bronze medals, so no boxers competed again after their first loss. Bouts consisted of four rounds of two minutes each, with one-minute breaks between rounds. Punches scored only if the white area on the front of the glove made full contact with the front of the head or torso of the opponent. Five judges scored each bout; three of the judges had to signal a scoring punch within one second for the punch to score. The winner of the bout was the boxer who scored the most valid punches by the end of the bout.

Eamonn O'Kane from Northern Ireland won the gold medal.

== Medalists ==
Gold	Eamonn O'Kane; Northern Ireland
Silver	Anthony Ogogo; England
Bronze	Vijender Singh; India
Bronze	Keiron Harding; Wales

== Tournament ==
=== Middleweight Bracket ===
Round of 32
Lawal Lukmon (NGR)	RSC
Imrod Bartholomew (GRN)
Damien Hooper (AUS)	16
Lad Agege (NRU)	3
Anthony Ogogo (ENG)	RSC
Andrew Kometa (KIR)
Nathon McKwen (NZL)	5
Lungile Dyamdeki (LES)	3
Eamonn O'Kane (NIR)	5
Ranil Jayathilakage (SRI)	0
Musa Ngozo (SWZ)
Seleman Kidunda (TAN)	RSCH
Afaese Fata (SAM)	8
Devon Boatswain (GUY)	1
Habib Ahmed (GHA)	1
Keiron Harding (WAL)	5
Fairus Mohd (MAS)	3
Jovan Young (JAM)	6
Sosefo Falekaono (TON)	3
Jovette Jean (SEY)	6
Peter Micheal (PNG)
Nisar Khan (PAK)	RSCH

Round of 16
Albert Blaize (DMA)
Elias Nashivela (NAM)	DSQ
Vijender Singh (IND)	RSC
Dick Ombaka (KEN)
Louis Olivier (MRI)
Lawal Lukmon (NGR)	KO
Damien Hooper (AUS)	3
Anthony Ogogo (ENG)	3
Nathon McKwen (NZL)	2
Eamonn O'Kane (NIR)	9
Seleman Kidunda (TAN)	2
Afaese Fata (SAM)	9
Keiron Harding (WAL)	8
Jovan Yound (JAM)	4
Jovette Jean (SEY)	1
Nisar Khan (PAK)	13

Quarterfinals
Elias Nashivela (NAM)
Vijender Singh (IND)	KO R1 1:22
Lawal Lukmon (NGR)	0
Anthony Ogogo (ENG)	10
Eamonn O'Kane (NIR)	7
Afaese Fata (SAM)	2
Keiron Harding (WAL)	5
Nisar Khan (PAK)	2

Semifinals
Vijender Singh (IND)	3
Anthony Ogogo (ENG)	4
Eamonn O'Kane (NIR)	12
Keiron Harding (WAL)	6

Finals
Anthony Ogogo (ENG)	4
Eamonn O'Kane (NIR)	16
