= Boxing at the 2010 South American Games – Men's 48kg =

The Men's 48 kg event at the 2010 South American Games had its quarterfinals held on March 22, the semifinals on March 24 and the final on March 27.

== Medalists ==
Gold	Silver	Bronze
Arles Contreras; Colombia	Carlos Pilataxi; Ecuador	Percy Pena Mori; Peru; Eduard Bermúdez; Venezuela

== Results ==
Quarterfinals
Paulo Carvalho (BRA)	13
Arles Contreras (COL)	15
Gilberto Pedroza (PAN)	2
Carlos Pilataxi (ECU)	7
Eduard Bermúdez (VEN)	12
Junior Zárate (ARG)	0

Semifinals
Percy Pena Mori (PER)	3
Arles Contreras (COL)	15
Carlos Pilataxi (ECU)	6
Eduard Bermúdez (VEN)	4

Final
Arles Contreras (COL)	+5
Carlos Pilataxi (ECU)	5
