= Philippines at the 2008 Summer Olympics =

- Flag of the Philippines
- IOC code: PHI
- NOC: Philippine Olympic Committee
- Website: www.olympic.ph

in Beijing
- Competitors: 15 in 8 sports
- Flag bearers: Manny Pacquiao (opening); Miguel Molina (closing)
- Medals: Gold 0 Silver 0 Bronze 0 Total 0

Summer Olympics appearances (overview)
- 1924; 1928; 1932; 1936; 1948; 1952; 1956; 1960; 1964; 1968; 1972; 1976; 1980; 1984; 1988; 1992; 1996; 2000; 2004; 2008; 2012; 2016; 2020; 2024; 2028

The Philippines competed at the 2008 Summer Olympics in Beijing, China. The country was represented by 15 athletes, 10 men and 5 women, who competed in 17 events across 8 sports.

The Philippine government and private sector pledged a combined sum of P15-million (US$340,909) for any athlete competing in the games who would win the country its first gold medal. Though Willy Wang won the gold medal in Wushu, it was not included in the medal tally because the Wushu tournament was a demonstration sport in the Olympic Games. Though several national records were broken in swimming and weightlifting events, the country failed to win any medals for the third consecutive Olympiad.

== Opening and closing ceremonies ==
On June 12, 2008, the Philippine Olympic Committee (POC) revealed that its executive committee had selected swimmer Miguel Molina to be flag bearer at the Opening Ceremony of the Olympic Games. In their decision, the POC cited Molina's performance in the 2007 Southeast Asian Games, where he won three individual gold medals and a team relay gold medal, set several national swimming records, and was selected as the meet's "Best Male Athlete". Molina was set to compete in the 200m breaststroke and 200m individual medley events at the games.

Philippine President Gloria Macapagal Arroyo later asked the POC to reconsider their decision, requesting instead that popular Filipino boxer Manny Pacquiao be given the honor of carrying the flag. Pacquiao was not a competitor at the games, but had recently won the World Boxing Council lightweight title in a highly publicized fight against David Diaz. POC president Jose Cojuangco agreed with the president's decision, saying having Pacquiao as flag bearer would be a morale booster to the athletes. Though the deadline for changing of the national contingent's composition in the Olympiad has already elapsed, special arrangements were made for Pacquiao to be given accreditation. On July 9, 2008, POC announced that everything had been cleared for Pacquiao to be official flag bearer. Miguel Molina, who did not mind yielding the honor to Pacquiao, was instead given the role of flag bearer at the closing ceremony.

The games' opening ceremony was attended by President Arroyo, the first Philippine president in history to do so. The Philippine delegation was the 164th to enter the Beijing National Stadium in the parade of nations.

== Overview by sport ==
=== Archery ===
Mark Javier

The Philippines was represented in the Men's individual archery event by Mark Javier, who earned his spot at the Olympics by winning the continental archery qualifiers in the 2007 Asian Archery Championships. In the ranking round he placed 36th out of 64 competitors, then lost in his first knockout matchup against Kuo Cheng Wei of Chinese Taipei.

Athlete	Event	Ranking round		Round of 64	Round of 32	Round of 16	Quarterfinals	Semifinals	Final / BM	
Athlete	Event	Score	Seed	Opposition Score	Opposition Score	Opposition Score	Opposition Score	Opposition Score	Opposition Score	Rank
Mark Javier	Men's individual	654	36	Kuo C-w (TPE) (29); L 102–106	Did not advance					

=== Athletics ===
The Philippines was represented in athletics by two long jumpers, Henry Dagmil and Marestella Torres. The two did not qualify to the games via the usual route, but were accepted as wild card entries by the International Olympic Committee upon the request of the Philippine Amateur Track and Field Association.

Dagmil registered just one successful jump in the qualifying round, finishing with a result of 7.58 meters, and was ranked 34th out of 41 competitors.

Torres, who hoped to improve upon her personal best of 6.63 meters, injured her left knee while picking up speed before taking off for her first jump. She finished the qualifying round with a result of 6.17 meters, and was ranked 35th out of 42 competitors.

Key

- Note–Ranks given for track events are within the athlete's heat only
- Q = Qualified for the next round
- q = Qualified for the next round as a fastest loser or, in field events, by position without achieving the qualifying target
- NR = National record
- N/A = Round not applicable for the event
- Bye = Athlete not required to compete in round

Men

Athlete	Event	Qualification		Final	
Athlete	Event	Distance	Position	Distance	Position
Henry Dagmil	Long jump	7.58	34	Did not advance	

Women

Athlete	Event	Qualification		Final	
Athlete	Event	Distance	Position	Distance	Position
Marestella Torres	Long jump	6.17	35	Did not advance	

=== Boxing ===
Though boxing has been the Philippines' traditional source of medals at the Olympics, the country's only representative for boxing at the Beijing Olympics was Harry Tañamor, who earned his spot at the games through his second-place finish at the World Amateur Boxing Championships in 2007. Tañamor was the only Filipino athlete predicted to win a medal in Sports Illustrated's Olympic Preview issue, which tipped him to capture the silver. However, he was defeated by Manyo Plange of Ghana in the first matchup of the games.

Athlete	Event	Round of 32	Round of 16	Quarterfinals	Semifinals	Final	
Athlete	Event	Opposition Result	Opposition Result	Opposition Result	Opposition Result	Opposition Result	Rank
Harry Tañamor	Light flyweight	Plange (GHA); L 3–6	Did not advance				

=== Diving ===
The Philippines was represented in diving events by two athletes—Rexel Ryan Fabriga, who competed in the men's 10 m platform, and Sheila Mae Perez, who competed in the women's 3 m springboard. Neither diver advanced past the preliminary stage of the competition.

During practice in Xi'an weeks before the Olympic games, Fabriga suffered a waist injury that seriously hampered the pace of his training. Both he and his coach admitted that his performance in the games would inevitably be affected by the injury, with the possibility that he would be unable to finish his dive. In the preliminary stage of the competition, Fabriga's opening dive was the least impressive of the round, and he went on to finish the preliminaries in 28th place in a field of 30.

Perez finished her preliminary round at 23rd place in a field of 30 divers.

Men

Athlete	Events	Preliminaries		Semifinals		Final	
Athlete	Events	Points	Rank	Points	Rank	Points	Rank
Rexel Ryan Fabriga	10 m platform	358.85	28	Did not advance			

Women

Athlete	Events	Preliminaries		Semifinals		Final	
Athlete	Events	Points	Rank	Points	Rank	Points	Rank
Sheila Mae Perez	3 m springboard	251.15	23	Did not advance			

=== Shooting ===
The Philippines was represented in trap shooting by 37-year-old Eric Ang, the team's oldest competing athlete. Ang narrowly failed to make the Olympic qualifying standard, but was able to compete as a wild card contestant.

Ang got off to a poor start in the qualifying round, shooting only 19 in the first string and ending the first day of qualifications ranked 30th of 35. He did not improve on the second day, and finished the event in last place.

Men

Athlete	Event	Qualification		Final	
Athlete	Event	Points	Rank	Points	Rank
Eric Ang	Trap	106	33	Did not advance	

=== Swimming ===
The Philippine swimming team had the largest share of the country's athletes represented in Beijing, with five swimmers competing in seven events. Though no Philippine swimmer advanced past the preliminary round of their respective events, several national swimming records were broken at the games: Miguel Molina completed the men's 200 m individual medley in 2:01.61, Christel Simms completed the women's 100 m freestyle in 56.67, JB Walsh completed the men's 200 m butterfly in 1:59.39 and won his heat but didn't move on, and Daniel Coakley completed the men's 50 m freestyle in 22.69. Walsh's and Coakley's achievements are also Southeast Asian records.

Men

Athlete	Event	Heat		Semifinal		Final	
Athlete	Event	Time	Rank	Time	Rank	Time	Rank
Ryan Arabejo	1500 m freestyle	15:42.27	32	—N/a		Did not advance	
Daniel Coakley	50 m freestyle	22.69	39	Did not advance			
Miguel Molina	200 m breaststroke	2:16.94	47	Did not advance			
Miguel Molina	200 m individual medley	2:01.61	27	Did not advance			
James Walsh	200 m butterfly	1:59.39 NR	29	Did not advance			

Women

Athlete	Event	Heat		Semifinal		Final	
Athlete	Event	Time	Rank	Time	Rank	Time	Rank
Christel Simms	50 m freestyle	26.64	47	Did not advance			
Christel Simms	100 m freestyle	56.67	41	Did not advance			

=== Taekwondo ===
The Philippines was represented by two taekwondo practitioners, Tshomlee Go and Mary Antoinette Rivero, both of whom had previously competed in the 2004 Summer Olympics in Athens.

Tshomlee Go's first matchup was against Ryan Carneli of Australia, who had narrowly defeated Go at the 2007 World Taekwondo Championships. Go failed to register any points in the match, losing in a 1–0 shutout.

Mary Antoinette Rivero also lost in her first match, against Sandra Šarić of Croatia.

Athlete	Event	Round of 16	Quarterfinals	Semifinals	Repechage	Bronze Medal	Final	
Athlete	Event	Opposition Result	Opposition Result	Opposition Result	Opposition Result	Opposition Result	Opposition Result	Rank
Tshomlee Go	Men's −58 kg	Carneli (AUS); L 0–1	Did not advance					
Mary Antoinette Rivero	Women's −67 kg	Šarić (CRO); L 1–4	Did not advance					

=== Weightlifting ===
Hidilyn Diaz was selected as a wild card entry to the Summer Olympics by the Philippine Weightlifting Association in early 2008. She is the first female weightlifter to compete for the Philippines in the Olympics, and the second weightlifter overall. Competing in the women's 58 kg class, 17-year-old Diaz lifted 85 kg in the snatch and 107 kg in the clean and jerk for a 192 kg total, breaking the Philippine record that she herself set at the 2007 Southeast Asian Games. Though she placed second to last in a field of 12 weightlifters, her performance was praised and considered promising for her age. Philippine Sports Commission Chairman William Ramirez said "She's here to gain valuable experience", and predicted that she would be a strong contender at future games. She is set to undergo an extensive training program to prepare her for the 2012 Summer Olympics in London.

Athlete	Event	Snatch		Clean & Jerk		Total	Rank
Athlete	Event	Result	Rank	Result	Rank	Total	Rank
Hidilyn Diaz	Women's −58 kg	85	11	107	11	192	10

== Media coverage ==
Solar Entertainment Corporation was the exclusive rights holder to broadcast coverage of the 2008 Summer Olympics in the Philippines. Solar sent a small crew to cover the games on-site. It offered an estimated 800 hours of Olympic coverage across its network during the two weeks of the games, including 24-hour coverage—a first for the country—on its flagship sports channel, Solar Sports.

Additionally, Solar Entertainment broadcast Olympic events over five of its other cable stations. All basketball events were shown on Basketball TV, and sports that attract the women audience like gymnastics and volleyball were shown on Solar's two female-oriented stations, ETC Entertainment Central and 2nd Avenue. Events were also shown on C/S, Jack TV, and pay-per-view component Solar All-Access.

== See also ==
- Philippines at the Olympics
- Philippines at the 2008 Summer Paralympics
