= 2008 Boxing World Cup =

Boxing competitions

The 2008 Boxing World Cup is a boxing competition between top ranked boxers in different weight categories. It was held in Moscow, Russia from December 10 to December 14.

== New format ==
The format for the 2008 competition changed when it was announced that the event would take place under a new format and become a biennial event. Whereas before the competition was between teams, now it will be between the top ranked boxers in their weight categories. The winning country will be the one taking more medals than any other, without any group stages as previously.

== Results ==
=== Light Flyweight (– 48 kg) ===
Semifinals
1	Yampier Hernández (CUB)	13
4	Birzhan Zhakypov (KAZ)	3
3	Harry Tanamor (PHI)	12
2	Łukasz Maszczyk (POL)	4

Final
Yampier Hernández (CUB)	7
Harry Tanamor (PHI)	15

=== Flyweight (– 51 kg) ===
Semifinals
1	Misha Aloyan (RUS)	14
4	Vincenzo Picardi (ITA)	4
3	Andry Laffita (CUB)	14
2	Jitender Kumar (IND)	6

Final
Misha Aloyan (RUS)	20
Andry Laffita (CUB)	6

=== Bantamweight (– 54 kg) ===
Semifinals
1	Vyacheslav Goyan (MDA)	15
4	Sergey Vodopyanov (RUS)	4
3	Yankiel León (CUB)	+4
2	Akhil Kumar (IND)	4

Final
Vyacheslav Goyan (MDA)	1
Yankiel León (CUB)	10

=== Featherweight (– 57 kg) ===
Semifinals
1	Sergei Ignatyev (RUS)	12
4	Bahodirjon Sooltonov (UZB)	7
3	Idel Torriente (CUB)	6
2	Anthresh Lalit Lakra (IND)	3

Final
Sergei Ignatyev (RUS)	8
Idel Torriente (CUB)	12

=== Lightweight (– 60 kg) ===
Semifinals
1	Hu Qing (CHN)	10
4	Famil Suleymanov (AZE)	4
3	Albert Selimov (RUS)	14
2	José Pedraza (PUR)	4

Final
Hu Qing (CHN)	10
Albert Selimov (RUS)	12

=== Light-Welterweight (– 64 kg) ===
Semifinals
1	Uranchimegiin Mönkh-Erdene (MGL)	11
4	Alexis Vastine (FRA)	8
3	Roniel Iglesias (CUB)	18
2	Alexandr Ivanov (RUS)	6

Final
Uranchimegiin Mönkh-Erdene (MGL)	2
Roniel Iglesias (CUB)	16

=== Welterweight (– 69 kg) ===
Semifinals
1	Carlos Banteux (CUB)	15
4	Jack Robert Culcay (GER)	4
3	Dilshod Mahmudov (UZB)	wo
2	Dmitrijs Sostaks (LAT)	wo

Final
Carlos Banteux (CUB)	15
Dilshod Mahmudov (UZB)	4

=== Middleweight (– 75 kg) ===
Semifinals
1	Alfonso Blanco (VEN)	15
4	Dmitry Chudinov (RUS)	8
3	Andranik Hakobyan (ARM)	12
2	Elshod Rasulov (UZB)	2

Final
Alfonso Blanco (VEN)	9
Andranik Hakobyan (ARM)	10

=== Light-Heavyweight (– 81 kg) ===
Semifinals
1	Abbos Atoev (UZB)	+9
4	Dzhakhon Kurbanov (TJK)	9
3	Artur Beterbiyev (RUS)	AB
2	Dinesh Kumar (IND)	AB

Final
Abbos Atoev (UZB)	7
Artur Beterbiyev (RUS)	17

=== Heavyweight (– 91 kg) ===
Semifinals
1	Osmay Acosta (CUB)	21
4	Roman Masalimov (RUS)	3
3	Oleksandr Usyk (UKR)	5
2	Mihail Muntean (MDA)	2

Final
Osmay Acosta (CUB)	w/o
Oleksandr Usyk (UKR)

=== Super Heavyweight (+ 91 kg) ===
Semifinals
1	Robert Alfonso (CUB)	11
4	Niyaz Fayzulin (RUS)	4
3	Marko Tomasović (CRO)	9
2	Azer Mamadov (AZE)	0

Final
Robert Alfonso (CUB)	w/o
Marko Tomasović (CRO)

== Medal table ==
Place	Country	Gold	Silver	Bronze	Total
1	Cuba	6	2	0	8
2	Russia	3	1	5	9
3	Armenia	1	0	0	1
3	Philippines	1	0	0	1
5	Uzbekistan	0	2	2	4
6	Moldova	0	1	1	2
7	Venezuela	0	1	0	1
7	China	0	1	0	1
7	Mongolia	0	1	0	1
7	Ukraine	0	1	0	1
7	Croatia	0	1	0	1
12	India	0	0	4	4
13	Azerbaijan	0	0	2	2
14	Germany	0	0	1	1
14	Italy	0	0	1	1
14	Kazakhstan	0	0	1	1
14	Latvia	0	0	1	1
14	Poland	0	0	1	1
14	Puerto Rico	0	0	1	1
14	Tajikistan	0	0	1	1
14	France	0	0	1	1
Всего		11	11	22	44
