= Paddy Barnes =

Irish boxer (born 1987)

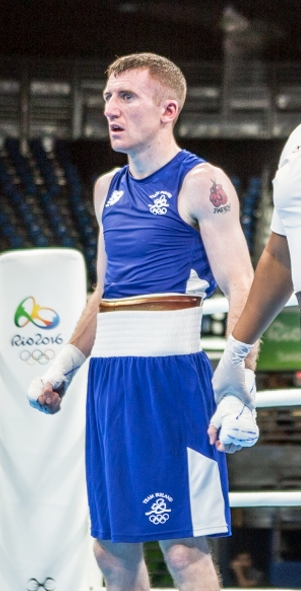
- Barnes at the 2016 Olympics

Personal information
- Nickname: The Leprechaun
- Nationality: Irish
- Born: Patrick Gerard Barnes; 9 April 1987 (age 39) Belfast, Northern Ireland, U.K.
- Height: 5 ft 4 in (163 cm)
- Weight: Flyweight

Boxing career
- Reach: 64 1/2 in (164 cm)
- Stance: Orthodox

Boxing record
- Total fights: 9
- Wins: 6
- Win by KO: 1
- Losses: 3
Medal record
Men's amateur boxing
Representing Ireland
Olympic Games
Bronze medal – third place	2008 Beijing	Light flyweight
Bronze medal – third place	2012 London	Light flyweight
European Championships
Gold medal – first place	2010 Moscow	Light flyweight
Silver medal – second place	2013 Minsk	Light flyweight
EU Championships
Silver medal – second place	2008 Cetniewo	Light flyweight
Representing Northern Ireland
Commonwealth Games
Gold medal – first place	2010 Delhi	Light flyweight
Gold medal – first place	2014 Glasgow	Light flyweight

Patrick Gerard Barnes MBE (born 9 April 1987) is an Irish former boxer who competed as an amateur from 2005 to 2016 and as a professional from 2016 to 2019. As an amateur he competed in the light-flyweight division, representing Ireland at the 2008, 2012, and 2016 Olympics; winning bronze medals in Beijing and London, and represented Northern Ireland at the 2010 and 2014 Commonwealth Games; winning a gold medal apiece at the two events. As a professional, he challenged for the WBC flyweight title in 2018.

== Early life ==
Barnes began boxing aged 11. He later joined the East Coast Boxing club. Barnes had an amateur record of 2-19 after his first 21 fights Aged 16, he joined Holy Family ABC in Belfast.

== Amateur career ==
=== 2007 | European Union Amateur Championships ===
In 2007, Barnes competed at the EU Championships in Dublin. He had his medal hopes crushed however when he suffered an eye injury. With bleeding found behind his retina, Barnes was forced out of the competition.

=== 2007 | World Amateur Championships ===
At the World Championships in Chicago Barnes missed out on a bronze medal after he was defeated by China's Zou Shiming in the quarter-finals, Zou went on to win the gold medal.

However, Barnes qualified for the 2008 Olympics by virtue of getting to the quarter-finals.

- 1st round – defeated Choi Jon Chuk North Korea 33–19
- Round of 32 – defeated Sadegh Zade Faraj Iran 30–10 (RSCO)
- Round of 16 – defeated Kenji Ohkubo Japan 24–6
- Quarter final – lost to Zou Shiming China 8–22

=== 2008 | European Union Amateur Championships ===
In 2008, Barnes returned to EU Championships, this time in Cetniewo, Poland.

Barnes made it to the final where he lost to Hungarian fighter Pál Bedák. The silver medal was enough to secure his place at the Summer Olympics.

=== 2008 | Olympic Games ===
Barnes won Ireland's inaugural medal, at the 2008 Summer Olympics, by winning his quarter final bout in the light flyweight division. Barnes won a bronze medal after he was defeated in a second match with Shiming Zou in the semi-final, in a match where replays showed some of Barnes landed punches counted as points for Zou.

- Round of 32 – bye
- Round of 16 – defeated José Luis Meza Ecuador 14–8
- Quarter final – defeated Łukasz Maszczyk Poland 11–5
- Semi-final – lost to Zou Shiming China 0–15

=== 2010 | European Amateur Championships ===
On 12 June 2010, Barnes won the gold medal in the light flyweight division at the 2010 European Amateur Boxing Championships. Barnes, a 4–1 winner over Azerbaijan's Elvin Mamishzade, was 1–0 up at the end of the first round, 3–1 ahead at the end of the second and sealed the victory with a final point in the third for 4–1.

=== 2010 | Commonwealth Games ===
Barnes represented Northern Ireland at the 2010 Commonwealth Games. He won the gold medal, defeating Namibia's Jafet Uutoni 8–4 in the final.

- Round of 16 – defeated Iain Butcher Scotland 4–2
- Quarter final – defeated Andrew Moloney Australia 5–3
- Semi final – defeated Amandeep Singh India 5–0
- Final – defeated Jafet Uutoni Namibia 8–4

=== 2012 | Olympic Games ===
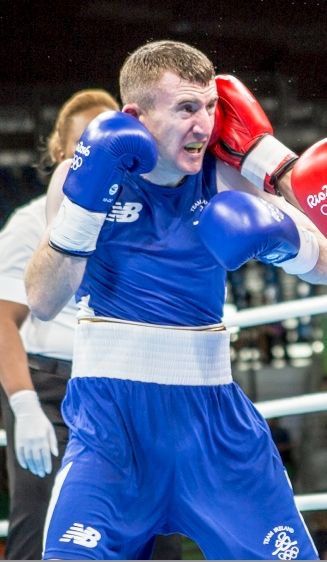
Barnes at the 2016 Olympics

At the 2012 Summer Olympics he defeated Thomas Essomba from Cameroon 15–10 then beat India's Devendro Singh in his quarter-final bout to guarantee himself at least another bronze medal. In doing so, he became the inaugural Irish boxer to win medals at two consecutive Summer Olympics.

For the semi-final, Barnes once again drew Chinese superstar Zou Shiming, who had defeated Barnes in the 2008 semi-finals before taking gold. Barnes gave a fearless performance against the three time World champion, with the judges tying them 15–15 on the scorecards, only for Barnes to lose via a 45–44 countback. Shiming once again went on to win gold.

- Round of 16 – defeated Thomas Essomba Cameroon 15–10
- Quarter final – defeated Devendro Singh India 23–18
- Semi-final – lost to Zou Shiming China 15–15 / 44–45 (CB)

=== 2014 | Commonwealth Games ===
As captain of the Northern Ireland boxing team in 2014 at Glasgow, Barnes led the way by winning gold in the flyweight division defeating India's Devendro Singh. It was the first time a Northern Irish boxer had successfully defended a Commonwealth title.

The tournament was held at the Scottish Exhibition and Conference Centre. 17 boxers from 17 nations took part.

After the competition, Barnes accepted an honour, the MBE, in the 2015 New Year Honours, for services to boxing and the community in Northern Ireland.

=== 2015 | World Series of Boxing ===
Barnes competed in the WSB for the 2014–2015 season. Along with Michael Conlan, he was drafted by Italia Thunder. His first fight came against Magomed Ibiyev of the Baku Fires, in Baku. Barnes won with a 49–46, 49–46, 50–44 unanimous decision.

His second fight was another win, this time over Anthony Ortiz as Italia Thunder met the Puerto Rico Hurricanes. The judges scored it 48–47, 49–46, 49–46 as Barnes took another unanimous decision win.

The Hussars of Poland were next up, in Konin. Barnes continued his perfect start to the season with a landslide 50–45, 50–43, 50–45 victory over Sebastien Jagodzinski.

His record for the season went to four wins with four unanimous decisions, when he defeated Kazakh fighter Temirtas Zhussupoy of the Astana Arlans in Kazakhstan. His next fight was in Maiquetia, with a split decision win over Caciques de Venezuela's Finol Rivas. The judges scored the bout 49–45, 49–45, 47–48 in favour of Barnes.

=== 2016 | Olympic Games ===
Barnes was also chosen to be the bearer of the Flag of Ireland Tricolour at the 2016 Summer Olympics, something that Barnes considered an "incredible honour". At the 2016 Summer Olympics Barnes was defeated 2–1 by Samuel Carmona in the round of 16.

=== Provincial and National Titles ===
Barnes lost the Ulster title in 2005, 2006 and 2007. He faced Jimmy Moore from Limerick in each of his national finals being runner up in 2006 but winning the All-Ireland title in 2007 and 2008.

== World Series of Boxing record ==
6 fights	5 wins	1 loss
By decision	5	1

No.	Result	Record	Team	Opponent (Team)	Type	Round, time	Date	Location	Notes
6	Win	5–1	Italia Thunder	Yoel Finol (Caciques de Venezuela)	SD	5	18 Apr 2015	Maiquetia, Venezuela	
5	Win	4–1	Italia Thunder	(Kazakhstan) Temirtas Zhussupov (Astana Arlans)	UD	5	28 Feb 2015	Almaty, Kazakhstan	
4	Win	3–1	Italia Thunder	Sebastien Jagodzinski (Hussars of Poland)	UD	5	13 Feb 2015	Konin, Poland	
3	Win	2–1	Italia Thunder	Anthony Ortiz (Puerto Rico Hurricanes)	UD	5	31 Jan 2015	Palermo, Italy	
2	Win	1–1	Italia Thunder	(Azerbaijan) Magomed Ibiyev (Baku Fires)	UD	5	18 Jan 2015	Baku, Azerbaijan	
1	Loss	0–1	Italia Thunder	Mohamed Flissi (Algeria Desert Hawks)	SD	5	13 Mar 2014	Algiers, Algeria	WSB debut

== Professional career ==
=== Barnes vs. Slavchev ===
After his amateur success, Barnes turned professional and made his debut as a bantamweight against Stefan Slavchev on 5 November 2016. Slavchev lifted Barnes into the air during the fourth round, so Barnes won the bout via disqualification.

=== Barnes vs. Rosales ===
On 18 August 2018, Barnes challenged Cristofer Rosales for his WBC world flyweight title. Barnes got off to a fast start, but was introduced to Rosales' power early in the first round. In the fourth round, Rosales caught Barnes with a vicious right-hand uppercut to the solar plexus. Barnes fell on the canvas and wasn't anywhere close to beating the count, which meant a KO victory for Rosales.

=== Barnes vs. Harris ===
On 11 October 2019, Barnes faced Jay Harris. Barnes was dropped by his opponent both in round three and round four. The latter proved to be the final one, as Barnes was not able to beat the count, and Harris was awarded the KO victory.

=== Retirement ===
In November 2019, Barnes announced his retirement from professional boxing.

== Professional boxing record ==
9 fights	6 wins	3 losses
By knockout	1	2
By decision	4	1
By disqualification	1	0

No.	Result	Record	Opponent	Type	Round, time	Date	Location	Notes
9	Loss	6–3	(United Kingdom) Jay Harris	KO	4 (10), 2:12	11 Oct 2019	(United Kingdom) Ulster Hall, Belfast, Northern Ireland	For vacant IBF Inter-Continental flyweight title
8	Win	6–2	(Nicaragua) Joel Sanchez	PTS	6	3 Aug 2019	(United Kingdom) Marquee Falls Park, Belfast, Northern Ireland	
7	Loss	5–2	(United States) Oscar Mojica	SD	6	17 Mar 2019	(United States) Hulu Theater, New York City, New York, US	
6	Loss	5–1	(Nicaragua) Cristofer Rosales	KO	4 (12), 3:00	18 Aug 2018	(United Kingdom) Windsor Park, Belfast, Northern Ireland	For WBC flyweight title
5	Win	5–0	(Nicaragua) Eliecer Quezada	KO	6 (10), 3:06	18 Nov 2017	(United Kingdom) SSE Arena, Belfast, Northern Ireland	Won vacant WBO Inter-Continental flyweight title
4	Win	4–0	(Spain) Juan Hinostroza	PTS	6	6 Oct 2017	(United Kingdom) Meadowbank Stadium, Edinburgh, Scotland	
3	Win	3–0	(Romania) Silviu Olteanu	MD	10	17 Jun 2017	(United Kingdom) Waterfront Hall, Belfast, Northern Ireland	Won vacant WBO European flyweight title
2	Win	2–0	(Argentina) Adrian Dimas Garzon	PTS	6	10 Mar 2017	(United Kingdom) Waterfront Hall, Belfast, Northern Ireland	
1	Win	1–0	(Bulgaria) Stefan Slavchev	DQ	4 (6), 2:05	5 Nov 2016	(United Kingdom) Titanic Exhibition Centre, Belfast, Northern Ireland	Slavchev disqualified for lifting Barnes

== Marriage ==
Barnes and Mari Burns, parents of two daughters, wed in July 2017 at St Bernard's Catholic Church, north Belfast. Barnes is also an Irish Speaker, and received a Silver Fáinne in 2019.

Sporting positions
Regional boxing titles
Vacant Title last held by Iain Butcher	WBO European flyweight champion 17 June 2017 – January 2018; Vacated	Vacant Title next held by Mirco Martin
Vacant Title last held by Donnie Nietes	WBO Inter-Continental flyweight champion 18 November 2017 – June 2018; Vacated	Vacant Title next held by Sunny Edwards
Olympic Games
Previous: Katie Taylor	Flagbearer for Ireland; 2016 Rio de Janeiro	Next: Brendan Irvine and Kellie Harrington
