= Boxing at the 2010 Commonwealth Games – Light flyweight =

The Light Flyweight class in the boxing at the 2010 Commonwealth Games competition is the lightest class. Light flyweights were limited to those boxers weighing less than 49 kilograms (108.02 lbs).

17 boxers competed in the event.

Like all Olympic boxing events, the competition was a straight single-elimination tournament. Both semifinal losers were awarded bronze medals, so no boxers competed again after their first loss. Bouts consisted of three rounds of three minutes each, with one-minute breaks between rounds. Punches scored only if the front of the glove made full contact with the front of the head or torso of the opponent. Five judges scored each bout; three of the judges had to signal a scoring punch within one second for the punch to score. The winner of the bout was the boxer who scored the most valid punches by the end of the bout.

== Medalists ==
Gold	Paddy Barnes; Northern Ireland
Silver	Jafet Uutoni; Namibia
Bronze	Muhammad Waseem; Pakistan
Bronze	Amandeep Singh; India

== Tournament ==
Round of 32
Amandeep Singh (IND)	6
Peter Warui (KEN)	2

Round of 16
Jafet Uutoni (NAM)	14
Lui Magaiva (PNG)	3
Christopher Katanga (ZAM)	3
Jason Lavigilante (MRI)	6
Muhammad Waseem (PAK)	11
Chaminda Tennakoon (SRI)	5
Duke Micah (GHA)	6
Lebogang Pilane (RSA)	4
Andrew Moloney (AUS)	RSCI
Paul Kava (SOL)
Paddy Barnes (NIR)	4
Lain Butcher (SCO)	2
Bathusi Mogajane (BOT)	2
Muhamad Fuad (MAS)	4
Haziza Matusi (RWA)	0
Amandeep Singh (IND)	4

Quarterfinals
Jafet Uutoni (NAM)	5
Jason Lavigilante (MRI)	0
Muhammad Waseem (PAK)	4
Duke Micah (GHA)	2
Andrew Moloney (AUS)	3
Paddy Barnes (NIR)	5
Muhamad Fuad (MAS)	1
Amandeep Singh (IND)	7

Semifinals
Jafet Uutoni (NAM)	10
Muhammad Waseem (PAK)	1
Paddy Barnes (NIR)	5
Amandeep Singh (IND)	0

Final
Jafet Uutoni (NAM)	4
Paddy Barnes (NIR)	8
