= Maszczyk =

Maszczyk is a Polish surname. Notable people with the surname include:

- Łukasz Maszczyk (born 1984), Polish amateur boxer
- Zygmunt Maszczyk (born 1945), Polish footballer
