= Elias Nashivela =

Namibian boxer

Personal information
- Nationality: Namibia
- Born: Elias Nashivela
- Weight: welterweight

Boxing career

Boxing record
- Total fights: 2
- Wins: 2
- Win by KO: 1

Elias Nashivela is a Namibian boxer. A middleweight, Nashivela competed for Namibia at the 2010 Commonwealth Games in the Middleweight division. In his first match, he beat Albert Blaize of Dominica. When the referee stopped the fight, Nashivela was up 19–0 in points in the 2nd round.

In 2006, Nashivela was a member of the under-20 Namibian national boxing team.
