= Boxing at the 2010 South American Games – Men's 54kg =

The Men's 54 kg event at the 2010 South American Games had its quarterfinals held on March 23, the semifinals on March 25 and the final on March 27.

== Medalists ==
Gold	Silver	Bronze
Oscar Negrete; Colombia	Alberto Melián; Argentina	Yohandry Campos; Venezuela; Cesar Dahua Tuisima; Peru

== Results ==
Quarterfinals
Yohandry Campos (VEN)	RSC
Bernardo Santura Paco (BOL)
Oscar Negrete (COL)	9
Jean Carvalho (BRA)	2

Semifinals
Alberto Melián (ARG)	5
Cesar Dahua Tuisima (PER)	2
Yohandry Campos (VEN)	1
Oscar Negrete (COL)	9

Final
Alberto Melián (ARG)	1
Oscar Negrete (COL)	10
