= Namibia at the 2010 Commonwealth Games =

- CGF code: NAM
- CGA: Namibian National Olympic Committee

in Delhi, India
- Medals Ranked 27th: Gold 0 Silver 1 Bronze 2 Total 3

Commonwealth Games appearances (overview)
- 1994; 1998; 2002; 2006; 2010; 2014; 2018; 2022; 2026; 2030

Namibia competed in the 2010 Commonwealth Games held in Delhi, India, from 3 to 14 October 2010. Namibia sent 28 athletes (19 male and 9 female) and 11 officials to the Games, which was fewer than it had in 2006. Namibian athletes competed in athletics, archery, boxing, cycling, gymnastics, bowls, shooting, and paralympics. It however won more medals then in 2006.

== Medals ==
	(gold)	(silver)	(bronze)	Total
Namibia	0	1	2	3

== Medalists ==
Medal	Name	Sport	Event
Silver	Japhet Uutoni	Boxing	Light flyweight
Bronze	Johanna Benson	Athletics	Women's 100 metres (T37)
Bronze	Gaby Ahrens	Shooting	Women's Trap (Singles)

== Archery ==
- Benjamin Van Wyk
- Johannes Grobler
- Dirk Bockmuhl

== Athletics ==
- Beata Naigambo
- Reinhold Iita

== Boxing ==
- Sakaria Lukas
- Mikka Shonnena
- Mujandjae Kasuto
- Elias Nashivela
- Tobias Munihango
- Japhet Uutoni

== Cycling ==
- Dan Craven
- Erik Hoffmann

== Gymnastics ==
- Kimberly-Ann Van Zyl
- Robert Honnibal

== Lawn Bowls ==
- Charlotte Morland
- Diana Viljoen
- Lesley Vermeulen
- Theuna Grobler
- Beatrix Lamprecht
- Willem Esterhuizen (Senior)
- Willem Esterhuizen (Junior)
- Jean Viljoen
- Graham Snyman
- Steven Peake

== Shooting ==
- Gaby Ahrens
- Gielie Van Wyk

== Paralympics ==
- Johanna Benson
- Ruben Soroseb

== See also ==
- 2010 Commonwealth Games
