= Winston Méndez Montero =

Dominican Republic boxer (born 1974)

Personal information
- Born: November 20, 1974 (age 51) Santo Domingo, Dominican Republic

Sport
- Sport: Boxing
Medal record
Men's boxing
Representing the Dominican Republic
Pan American Games
Bronze medal – third place	2007 Rio de Janeiro	Light flyweight

Winston Méndez Montero (born November 20, 1974) is a Dominican boxer who won bronze at the 2007 Pan American Games by losing his semi to Luis Yáñez: 6:14. He had defeated Oscar Negrete previously.

He won against Odilion Zaleta and Yampier Hernández in the second Olympic qualifier. He lost the final to Paulo Carvalho, although this did not affect his qualification.
