= José Luis Meza =

Ecuadorian boxer

José Luis Meza (born 24 September 1984 in Zamora-Chinchipe) is a boxer from Ecuador who qualified for the Olympics 2008 at light-flyweight.

== Career ==
Meza is the youngest of 10 brothers. In the qualifier he beat every opponent including the decorated Odilion Zaleta to make it to Beijing. There he lost his first bout 8:14 to Paddy Barnes (Boxing at the 2008 Summer Olympics – Light flyweight).
