= Boxing at the 2007 Pan American Games =

- Dates: July 20–28, 2007

The Men's Boxing Tournament at the 2007 Pan American Games was held in Rio de Janeiro, Brazil from July 20 to July 28. It served as a qualification tournament for the 2008 Summer Olympics in Beijing, PR China. The number one and two earned a ticket for the Olympic Tournament.

There were three qualifying events for the Boxing Tournament at the 2007 Pan American Games:

- Pan American Games Qualifier 1 in Barquisimeto, Venezuela from February 2 to February 8, 2007
- Pan American Games Qualifier 2 in Buenos Aires, Argentina from March 15 to March 20, 2007
- Pan American Games Qualifier 3 in Port of Spain, Trinidad from April 23 to April 28, 2007

== Medal summary ==
=== Medal table ===
* Host nation (Brazil)

Rank	NOCs	Gold	Silver	Bronze	Total
1	Cuba	5	1	2	8
2	United States	2	1	1	4
3	Puerto Rico	1	2	2	5
4	Brazil*	1	1	6	8
5	Colombia	1	1	0	2
6	Mexico	1	0	1	2
7	Dominican Republic	0	3	1	4
8	Venezuela	0	2	0	2
9	Ecuador	0	0	3	3
10	Argentina	0	0	2	2
11	Canada	0	0	1	1
11	Guyana	0	0	1	1
11	Jamaica	0	0	1	1
11	Nicaragua	0	0	1	1
Totals (14 entries)		11	11	22	44

=== Medalists ===
Event	Gold	Silver	Bronze
Light Flyweight (– 48 kilograms)	Luis Yáñez; United States	Kevin Betancourt; Venezuela	Winston Méndez; Dominican Republic
Light Flyweight (– 48 kilograms)	Luis Yáñez; United States	Kevin Betancourt; Venezuela	Carlos Ortíz; Puerto Rico
Flyweight (– 51 kilograms)	McWilliams Arroyo; Puerto Rico	Juan Carlos Payano; Dominican Republic	Yoandri Salinas; Cuba
Flyweight (– 51 kilograms)	McWilliams Arroyo; Puerto Rico	Juan Carlos Payano; Dominican Republic	Braulio Ávila; Mexico
Bantamweight (– 54 kilograms)	Carlos Cuadras; Mexico	Claudio Marrero; Dominican Republic	James Pereira; Brazil
Bantamweight (– 54 kilograms)	Carlos Cuadras; Mexico	Claudio Marrero; Dominican Republic	Clive Atwell; Guyana
Featherweight (– 57 kilograms)	Idel Torriente; Cuba	Abner Cotto; Puerto Rico	Davi Souza; Brazil
Featherweight (– 57 kilograms)	Idel Torriente; Cuba	Abner Cotto; Puerto Rico	Orlando Rizo; Nicaragua
Lightweight (– 60 kilograms)	Yordenis Ugás; Cuba	Éverton Lopes; Brazil	Luis Rueda; Argentina
Lightweight (– 60 kilograms)	Yordenis Ugás; Cuba	Éverton Lopes; Brazil	José Pedraza; Puerto Rico
Light Welterweight (– 64 kilograms)	Karl Dargan; United States	Jonathan González; Puerto Rico	Myke Carvalho; Brazil
Light Welterweight (– 64 kilograms)	Karl Dargan; United States	Jonathan González; Puerto Rico	Inocente Fiss; Cuba
Welterweight (– 69 kilograms)	Pedro Lima; Brazil	Demetrius Andrade; United States	Diego Chaves; Argentina
Welterweight (– 69 kilograms)	Pedro Lima; Brazil	Demetrius Andrade; United States	Ricardo Smith; Jamaica
Middleweight (– 75 kilograms)	Emilio Correa; Cuba	Argenis Núñez; Dominican Republic	Glaucélio Abreu; Brazil
Middleweight (– 75 kilograms)	Emilio Correa; Cuba	Argenis Núñez; Dominican Republic	Carlos Góngora; Ecuador
Light Heavyweight (– 81 kilograms)	Eleider Álvarez; Colombia	Yusiel Nápoles; Cuba	Julio Castillo; Ecuador
Light Heavyweight (– 81 kilograms)	Eleider Álvarez; Colombia	Yusiel Nápoles; Cuba	Christopher Downs; United States
Heavyweight (– 91 kilograms)	Osmay Acosta; Cuba	José Payares; Venezuela	Rafael Lima; Brazil
Heavyweight (– 91 kilograms)	Osmay Acosta; Cuba	José Payares; Venezuela	Jorge Quiñónes; Ecuador
Super Heavyweight (+ 91 kilograms)	Robert Alfonso; Cuba	Óscar Rivas; Colombia	Didier Bence; Canada
Super Heavyweight (+ 91 kilograms)	Robert Alfonso; Cuba	Óscar Rivas; Colombia	Antônio Nogueira; Brazil
