= Harry Tañamor =

Filipino boxer

Personal information
- Nationality: Filipino
- Born: August 20, 1977 (age 48) Zamboanga City, Zamboanga del Sur, Philippines
- Height: 5 ft 5 in (165 cm)
- Weight: 106 lb (48 kg)

Sport
- Sport: Boxing
- Weight class: Light flyweight
Medal record
World Amateur Championships
Silver medal – second place	2007 Chicago	Light Flyweight
Bronze medal – third place	2001 Belfast	Light Flyweight
Bronze medal – third place	2003 Bangkok	Light Flyweight
Boxing World Cup
Gold medal – first place	2008 Moscow	Light Flyweight
Asian Games
Silver medal – second place	2002 Busan	Light Flyweight
Asian Championships
Gold medal – first place	2005 Ho Chi Minh City	Light Flyweight
Southeast Asian Games
Silver medal – second place	2009 Vientiane	Light Flyweight
Gold medal – first place	2005 Manila	Light Flyweight
Gold medal – first place	2003 Ho Chi Minh City	Light Flyweight

Harry Tañamor (born August 20, 1977) is a Filipino amateur boxer best known to medal repeatedly on the world stage at light flyweight.

== Career ==
The southpaw is competing in the Light Flyweight (– 48 kg) division, and won bronze medals at the 2001 World Amateur Boxing Championships and 2003 World Amateur Boxing Championships. He competed at the 2004 Summer Olympics, but was knocked off in the round of 16 by Hong Moo-Won of South Korea. He qualified for the Athens Games by ending up in second place in the 2nd AIBA Asian 2004 Olympic Qualifying Tournament in Karachi, Pakistan, behind Hong Moo-Won.

At the 2007 World Amateur Boxing Championships in Chicago he defeated local hero Luis Yanez but lost to favorite Zou Shiming in the final.

Tañamor competed in the 2008 Summer Olympics in Beijing, entering in the light flyweight class. He was the only Filipino athlete predicted to win a medal by Sports Illustrated's Olympic Preview issue. However, he was defeated by Manyo Plange of Ghana in the Round of 32, 6 to 3.

At the 2008 Boxing World Cup, Tañamor defeated Yampier Hernández of Cuba in the light flyweight final to win the gold.
