= Jack Willie =

Papua New Guinea boxer

Personal information
- Born: April 15, 1979 (age 47)
- Height: 1.65 m (5 ft 5 in)
- Weight: 48 kg (106 lb)

Sport
- Country: Papua New Guinea
- Sport: Boxing
- Event: Light-Flyweight

Jack Willie (born April 15, 1979) is an amateur boxer from Papua New Guinea who won the Oceania Championships 2006, 2007 and 2008 at Junior Flyweight and qualified for the 2008 Summer Olympics.

At the 2006 Commonwealth Games he won his first fight, but then lost against eventual winner Japhet Uutoni and was eliminated. At the 2008 Olympics he lost in the first round to Amnat Ruenroeng of Thailand 2:14.
