= Tugstsogt Nyambayar =

Mongolian boxer

Personal information
- Native name: Нямбаярын Төгсцогт
- Nickname: King Tug
- Nationality: Mongolian
- Born: Нямбаярын Төгсцогт; Nyambayaryn Tögstsogt; 23 June 1992 (age 34) Ulaanbaatar, Mongolia
- Height: 5 ft 7 in (170 cm)
- Weight: Featherweight

Boxing career
- Reach: 67 in (170 cm)
- Stance: Orthodox

Boxing record
- Total fights: 16
- Wins: 13
- Win by KO: 9
- Losses: 2
- Draws: 1
Medal record
Men's amateur boxing
Representing Mongolia
Olympic Games
Silver medal – second place	2012 London	Flyweight
World Championships
Silver medal – second place	2009 Milan	Flyweight
World University Championships
Gold medal – first place	2010 Ulaanbaatar	Flyweight
Asian Championships
Bronze medal – third place	2009 Zhuhai	Light Flyweight

Tugstsogt Nyambayar (Mongolian: Нямбаярын Төгсцогт, romanized: Nyambayaryn Tögstsogt; born 23 June 1992) is a Mongolian professional boxer who held the IBO featherweight title in 2019 and challenged for the WBC featherweight title in 2020. As an amateur, he won silver medals at the 2009 World Championships and 2012 London Olympics.

== Amateur career ==
He won the silver medal at the 2009 World Amateur Boxing Championships. After that, Nyambayar won the silver medal at the 2012 London Olympics, losing to the Cuban boxer Robeisy Ramírez by a score of 14:17 in the final.

== Professional career ==
In 2015, he signed with the manager/adviser Al Haymon and made his professional boxing debut in March of that year. Nyambayar made his professional debut against Gabriel Braxton on 13 March 2015, and won the fight by a first-round knockout. He amassed an 8–0 record during the next two years, with all of those victories coming by way of stoppage.

Nyambayar made his first step-up in competition on 18 November 2017, when he faced the undefeated Harmonito Dela Torre. He won the fight by unanimous decision, the first decision win of his professional career, with two judges scoring the fight 78–73 in his favor and the third judge scoring it 79–73 for Nyambayar. Nyambayar then faced the one-time WBC featherweight title challenger Óscar Escandón on 26 May 2018. He won the fight by a third-round technical knockout. Escandón was knocked down five times by the midway point of the third round, which forced referee Keith Hughes to wave the fight off.

Nyambayar faced the former WBA interim and IBO featherweight champion Claudio Marrero in a WBC featherweight title eliminator on 26 January 2019, at the Barclays Center in New York City. Aside from the bout being a title eliminator, the vacant IBO featherweight belt was on the line as well. Nyambayar won the fight by unanimous decision, with scores of 114–113, 115–112 and 116–111. Marrero had a strong start to the bout, but Nyambayar began to take over from the fifth round onward. On 23 October 2019, the reigning WBC featherweight champion Gary Russell Jr. was ordered to make a mandatory title defense against Nyambayar. The fight was booked as the event headliner of a February 8, 2020, Showtime card that took place at the PPL Center in Allentown, Pennsylvania. Russell Jr. won the fight by unanimous decision, with scores of 118–110, 117–111 and 116–112.

Nyambayar was booked to face Cobia Breedy on 19 September 2020, in yet another WBC title eliminator. Nyambayar won the fight a narrow split decision. Two judges scored the fight 114–112 and 114–113 in his favor, while the third judge scored the bout 115–111 for Breedy. Breedy was knocked down in both the first and second round. Instead of waiting for another WBC title shot at featherweight, Nyambayar opted to move up to super-featherweight in order to challenge the WBA interim champion Chris Colbert. Colbert won the fight by unanimous decision, with scores of 118–110, 117–111 and 118–110. Colbert utilized his height and reach advantage to great effect, keeping Nyambayar at bay with the jab for the majority of the fight. He landed 112 jabs, while the much shorter Nyambayar managed to land only 20 jabs himself.

Nyambayar returned to featherweight, after suffering his second professional loss, and was booked to face Sakaria Lukas. The fight was ruled a split draw, with scores of 96–94, 95–95 and 94–96. The major point of contention after the fight was a knockdown in round eight, which referee Eddie Claudio failed to call. Had the knockdown been called, Lukas would've won the bout by majority decision.

== Professional boxing record ==
16 fights	13 wins	2 losses
By knockout	9	0
By decision	4	2
Draws	1	

No.	Result	Record	Opponent	Type	Round, time	Date	Location	Notes
16	Win	13–2–1	Mark Sales	UD	6	15 Feb 2025	ASA Arena, Ulaanbaatar, Mongolia	
15	Draw	12–2–1	Sakaria Lukas	SD	10	22 Jan 2022	Borgata Hotel Casino, Atlantic City, New Jersey, US	
14	Loss	12–2	Chris Colbert	UD	12	3 Jul 2021	Dignity Health Sports Park, Carson, California, US	For WBA interim super featherweight title
13	Win	12–1	Cobia Breedy	SD	12	19 Sep 2020	Mohegan Sun Arena, Uncasville, Connecticut, US	
12	Loss	11–1	Gary Russell Jr.	UD	12	8 Feb 2020	PPL Center, Allentown, Pennsylvania, US	For WBC featherweight title
11	Win	11–0	Claudio Marrero	UD	12	26 Jan 2019	Barclays Center, New York City, New York, US	Won vacant IBO featherweight title
10	Win	10–0	Óscar Escandón	TKO	3 (10), 1:18	26 May 2018	Beau Rivage Resort and Casino, Biloxi, Mississippi, US	
9	Win	9–0	Harmonito Dela Torre	UD	8	18 Nov 2017	Cosmopolitan of Las Vegas, Las Vegas, Nevada, US	
8	Win	8–0	Jhon Gemino	TKO	10 (10), 1:05	25 Feb 2017	Legacy Arena, Birmingham, Alabama, US	
7	Win	7–0	German Meraz	RTD	5 (8), 3:00	8 Dec 2016	Orange County Fairgrounds, Costa Mesa, California, US	
6	Win	6–0	Rafael Vazquez	TKO	1 (10), 1:24	15 Jul 2016	Horseshoe Casino, Tunica, Mississippi, US	
5	Win	5–0	Juan Ruiz	RTD	4 (6), 3:00	5 May 2016	Irvine, California, US	
4	Win	4–0	Pedro Melo	KO	2 (8), 1:44	3 Dec 2015	The Hangar, Costa Mesa, California, US	
3	Win	3–0	Arturo Badillo	RTD	3 (8), 3:00	27 Aug 2015	The Hangar, Costa Mesa, California, US	
2	Win	2–0	Manuel Rubalcava	KO	1 (4), 1:38	18 Apr 2015	StubHub Center, Carson, California, US	
1	Win	1–0	Gabriel Braxton	KO	1 (4), 2:10	13 Mar 2015	Citizens Business Bank Arena, Ontario, California, US	

Sporting positions
Minor world boxing titles
Vacant Title last held by Claudio Marrero	IBO featherweight champion 26 January 2019 – 8 February 2020; Stripped	Vacant
