= Alberto Melián =

Argentine boxer (born 1990)

Personal information
- Nickname: Impacto
- Nationality: (Argentina) Argentine
- Born: Alberto Ezequiel Melian; 2 January 1990 (age 36) Villa Dolores, Córdoba, Argentina
- Height: 1.70 m (5 ft 7 in)
- Weight: Bantamweight; Super bantamweight; Featherweight

Boxing career
- Stance: Orthodox

Boxing record
- Total fights: 15
- Wins: 11
- Win by KO: 7
- Losses: 2
- Draws: 1
Medal record
Men's amateur boxing
Representing Argentina
South American Games
Silver medal – second place	2010 Medellin	Light flyweight

Alberto Ezequiel Melián (born 2 January 1990) is an Argentinian boxer.

== Amateur career ==
Melián reached the final of the 2010 South American Games at light flyweight, but lost to Oscar Negrete. At the 2012 Summer Olympics he was defeated in the preliminary round of the men's bantamweight tournament by Sergey Vodopyanov, 5–12. At the 2016 Summer Olympics he again participated in the men's bantamweight tournament, winning his first two bouts but losing to Murodjon Akhmadaliev by technical knockout in the quarter-finals. Among Melian's outstanding amateur victories were wins over Cuban Olympic champion Robeisy Ramírez and Frenchman Khedafi Djelkhir, Olympic silver medalist in Beijing 2008 and APB Series World Champion. In 2014, Melián was awarded the "Firpo de Oro" as the best boxer in the country, amateur or professional, by the Boxing's Journalist Union of Argentina (UPERBOX). He expects to compete for a world title before his tenth professional fight.

== Professional career ==
Melián made his professional debut in December 2017 against former world title challenger Diego Santillan. Considered by several experts as the best Argentine amateur boxer of the last decade, Melian represented Argentina in numerous international tournaments, including double Olympic participation at the Olympic Games in London 2012 and Rio de Janeiro in 2016. After knocking out the former world title contender Diego Ricardo Santillan in the fifth round in his debut (who entered the ring at 23–2), Melian received the challenge of Aristule, who was present at ringside. Melian accepted the challenge, but asked Aristule to put his national title on the line.

== Professional boxing record ==
14 fights	11 wins	2 losses
By knockout	7	0
By decision	4	2
Draws	1	

No.	Result	Record	Opponent	Type	Round, time	Date	Location	Notes
14	Win	11–2–1	(Colombia) Johan Segura	TKO	9 (10), 1:46	10 Mar 2023	Estadio Luna Park, Buenos Aires, Argentina	Retained WBO Latino featherweight title; Won vacant IBF Latino featherweight title
13	Win	10–2–1	(Brazil) Carlos Henrique Rodrigues da Silva	KO	6 (10)	12 Nov 2022	Asociación Atlética Argentinos Juniors, Buenos Aires, Argentina	Won vacant WBO Latino featherweight title
12	Draw	9–2–1	(Argentina) Alan Isaias Luques Castillo	SD	10	15 Apr 2022	Casino Buenos Aires, Buenos Aires, Argentina	For vacant IBF Latino featherweight title
11	Win	9–2	(Dominican Republic) Frency Fortunato Saya	UD	10	27 Mar 2021	Club Atletico Lanus, Lanus, Argentina	Won vacant WBA Inter-Continental featherweight title
10	Win	8–2	(Argentina) Luis Fernando Molina	TKO	9 (10)	12 Feb 2021	Microestadio Municipal, Hurlingham, Argentina	Won vacant WBA Fedebol super bantamweight title
9	Win	7–2	(Argentina) Martin Orlando Rocha	UD	6	11 Dec 2020	Microestadio Municipal de Garín, Garín, Argentina	
8	Loss	6–2	(Colombia) Oscar Negrete	UD	10	6 Feb 2020	(United States) Fantasy Springs Resort Casino, Indio, California, U.S.	For WBA International bantamweight title
7	Win	6–1	(Mexico) Juan Kantun	KO	2 (8), 1:36	23 Nov 2019	(United States) Fantasy Springs Resort Casino, Indio, California, U.S.	
6	Loss	5–1	(Mexico) Leonardo Baez	UD	10	18 Jul 2019	(United States) Fantasy Springs Resort Casino, Indio, California, U.S.	Lost NABA super bantamweight title
5	Win	5–0	(United States) Isaac Zarate	UD	10	26 Apr 2019	(United States) Kia Forum, Inglewood, California, U.S.	Retained NABA super bantamweight title
4	Win	4–0	(Mexico) Edgar Ortega	TKO	10 (10), 1:33	26 Jan 2019	(United States) Toyota Center, Houston, Texas, U.S.	Won vacant NABA super bantamweight title
3	Win	3–0	(Argentina) Sergio Sosa	UD	10	26 May 2018	Asociación Atlética Argentinos Juniors, Buenos Aires, Argentina	
2	Win	2–0	(Argentina) Julian Evaristo Aristule	TKO	8 (10), 0:15	17 Mar 2018	Club Social y Deportivo Comercio, Villa Dolores, Argentina	Won Argentina (FAB) super bantamweight title
1	Win	1–0	(Argentina) Diego Santillan	KO	5 (8)	12 Dec 2017	Estadio F.A.B, Buenos Aires, Argentina	
