= Suleiman Bilali =

Kenyan boxer (born 1978)

Personal information
- Full name: Suleiman Wanjau Bilali
- Nationality: Kenya
- Born: June 5, 1978 (age 48) Nairobi
- Height: 1.54 m (5 ft 1 in)
- Weight: 48 kg (106 lb)

Sport
- Sport: Boxing
- Weight class: Light Flyweight
- Club: Kenya Police
Medal record
All-Africa Games
Gold medal – first place	2003 Abuja	Light Flyweight
Gold medal – first place	2007 Algiers	Light Flyweight

Suleiman Wanjau Bilali (born June 5, 1978) is a Kenyan light flyweight boxer. He has represented Kenya numerous times at international competitions.

Bilali fought at the 2000 Summer Olympics, where he was edged out by Spain's eventual runner-up Rafael Lozano 10:11 in the quarterfinal.

At the 2002 Commonwealth Games in Manchester Bilali lost by technical knockout to India's Muhammed Ali Qamar. He won the 2003 All-Africa Games.

Bilali participated in neither the 2004 Summer Olympics nor in the Commonwealth Games 2006.

Bilali was again victorious in the 2007 All African Games vs. Simanga Shiba and Manyo Plange and qualified for the Olympics but lost his match 3:9 to Dominican Winston Méndez Montero. He lost his first bout during the Beijing Olympics in 2008.

Bilali has since moved to professional boxing.ce
