= Joshua Franco =

American boxer (born 1995)

Personal information
- Nickname: El Profesor ("The Professor")
- Born: October 27, 1995 (age 30) San Antonio, Texas, U.S.
- Height: 5 ft 5 in (165 cm)
- Weight: Super flyweight; Bantamweight

Boxing career
- Reach: 67 in (170 cm)
- Stance: Orthodox

Boxing record
- Total fights: 24
- Wins: 18
- Win by KO: 8
- Losses: 2
- Draws: 3
- No contests: 1
Medal record
Men's amateur boxing
Representing United States
National Championships
Silver medal – second place	2014 Airway Heights	Light Flyweight

Joshua Franco (born October 27, 1995) is an American former professional boxer who competed from 2015 to 2023. He held the World Boxing Association (WBA) super flyweight title from 2020 and 2023. He is the older brother of two-weight world champion Jesse Rodriguez.

== Professional career ==
=== Early career ===
Franco made his professional debut on August 6, 2015, scoring a four-round split decision (SD) victory over Temoatzin Landeros at the Belasco Theater in Los Angeles, California. He amassed a 14–1 record during the next three years, with six of those victories coming by way of stoppage.

Franco was scheduled to challenge Oscar Negrete for the WBC-NABF bantamweight title on October 4, 2018, at The Hangar in Costa Mesa, California. The bout was set as the main event of an ESPN2 and ESPN Deportes broadcast card. The fight, in which both men threw over 1000 punches, was ruled a split draw. Each fighter received a 96–94 scorecard from one of the judges, while the third judge scored the fight a 95–95 draw. An immediate rematch between the pair was set, with the WBC-NABF and vacant WBA International bantamweight titles on the line. The rematch was scheduled for April 25, 2019, as the co-main event of a junior welterweight bout between Yves Ulysse Jr. and Steve Claggett, and was broadcast by DAZN. Franco won the fight by split decision, with one score of 98–92 for Negrete and 96–94 and 97–93 for Franco. Franco made the first defense of his two secondary title against Oscar Negrete on August 10, 2019. The trilogy bout was scheduled as the co-main event of a welterweight fight between Vergil Ortiz Jr. and Antonio Orozco. Franco and Negrete once again fought to a split decision draw, with scores of 96–94, 95–95 and 93–96, the same as in their first meeting.

Franco was scheduled to face Jose Alejandro Burgos in a non-title bout on January 11, 2020, on a DAZN broadcast card. Franco moved back down to super flyweight from bantamweight for this bout. He won the fight by a ninth-round technical knockout.

=== WBA super flyweight champion ===
==== The Moloney trilogy ====
After compiling a record of 16–1–2 (8 KOs) he challenged WBA (Regular) super flyweight champion, Andrew Moloney, on June 23, 2020, at the MGM Grand in Paradise, Nevada. After a competitive back-and-forth fight in which Franco scored a knockdown in the eleventh round, he defeated Moloney via twelve-round unanimous decision (UD) to capture the WBA (Regular) title. Two judges scored the bout 114–113 while the third scored it 115–112, with the eleventh-round knockdown being the deciding factor in Franco's victory; had he not scored the knockdown, Moloney would have retained his title through a majority draw. According to CompuBox stats, Franco landed 231 out of 789 (29.3%) punches thrown while Moloney landed 191 out of 663 (28.8%).

The pair agreed to fight an immediate rematch on November 14, 2020, at the MGM Grand Conference Center in Paradise, Nevada, on the undercard of the Terence Crawford and Kell Brook welterweight title bout. Referee Russell Mora declared the fight a no contest, after the ringside doctor stopped the fight at the beginning of the third round due to a swelling around Franco's right eye, which resulted from a headbutt according to the referee. Moloney's corner disputed this, which led to a 20 minute instant replay review by the NSAC who confirmed Mora's decision.

Due to the controversial nature of their second meeting, a trilogy bout was scheduled for August 14, 2021, which took place at the Hard Rock Hotel & Casino in Tulsa, Oklahoma. The title fight was set as the main event of an ESPN broadcast card, with most odds-makers having Moloney as the favorite at -240. Franco retained the title by unanimous decision, with all three judges awarding him a 116–112 scorecard. He outlanded Moloney 168 to 107 in total punches, and 127 to 73 in power punches landed.

==== Promotion to undisputed champion ====
On February 9, 2022, the WBA ordered the WBA "Super" champion Juan Francisco Estrada to defend his title against Franco. The pair were given until March 11 to come to terms. As the pair failed to do so, a purse bid was scheduled for April 18, 2022, which was later postponed by 24 hours. The promotional rights were won by Golden Boy Promotions, who bid $120,000, with a 75/25 split in favor of Estrada. Although the bout was officially expected to take place on July 16, 2022, it was eventually postponed to August 20. On July 18, Estrada's trainer Alfredo Caballero stated in an interview with Izquierdazo that Estrada would vacate the WBA title in order to pursue a trilogy match with Román González. On August 11, 2022, Estrada officially relinquished the super flyweight "Super" title. Immediately afterwards, Franco was promoted to undisputed status and remained the sanctioning body's sole titleholder at junior bantamweight.

==== Franco vs. Ioka duology ====
On October 11, 2022, it was revealed that Franco has entered into negotiations for a title unification fight with the reigning WBO super flyweight champion Kazuto Ioka. It was confirmed a month later that the title bout would take place on New Year's Eve at the Ota City General Gymnasium in Tokyo, Japan. On November 4, the WBO furthermore ordered the winner of the fight to face the sanctioning body's former flyweight champion Junto Nakatani in a mandatory title defense no later than 180 days afterwards. The fight ended in a majority decision draw. One judge scored it 115–113 for Franco, while the remaining two judges scored it as a 114–114 draw.

Due to the inconclusive nature of their first meeting, both Franco and Ioka agreed to an immediate rematch. As Ioka was ordered to make a mandatory title defense against Junto Nakatani directly after facing Franco, he instead opted to vacate the title, meaning the rematch would only have the WBA super flyweight title on the line. The championship bout was booked to take place on June 24, 2023, at the Ota City General Gymnasium in Tokyo, Japan. Franco was stripped of the WBA title at the official weigh-ins, as he came in nearly two full divisions above the super flyweight limit. He lost the fight by unanimous decision, with two scorecards of 116–112 and one scorecard of 115–113.

== Professional boxing record ==
24 fights	18 wins	2 losses
By knockout	8	1
By decision	10	1
Draws	3	
No contests	1	

No.	Result	Record	Opponent	Type	Round, time	Date	Location	Notes
24	Loss	18–2–3 (1)	Kazuto Ioka	UD	12	Jun 24, 2023	Ota City General Gymnasium, Ōta, Tokyo, Japan	WBA super flyweight title at stake only for Ioka as Franco missed weight
23	Draw	18–1–3 (1)	Kazuto Ioka	MD	12	Dec 31, 2022	Ota City General Gymnasium, Ōta, Tokyo, Japan	Retained WBA super flyweight title; For WBO super flyweight title
22	Win	18–1–2 (1)	Andrew Moloney	UD	12	Aug 14, 2021	Hard Rock Hotel & Casino, Tulsa, Oklahoma, U.S.	Retained WBA (Regular) super flyweight title
21	NC	17–1–2 (1)	Andrew Moloney	NC	3 (12), 0:01	Nov 14, 2020	MGM Grand Conference Center, Paradise, Nevada, U.S.	Retained WBA (Regular) super flyweight title; Fight stopped after Franco suffered an eye injury from an accidental head clash
20	Win	17–1–2	Andrew Moloney	UD	12	Jun 23, 2020	MGM Grand Conference Center, Paradise, Nevada, U.S.	Won WBA (Regular) super flyweight title
19	Win	16–1–2	Jose Alejandro Burgos	TKO	9 (10), 2:13	Jan 11, 2020	Alamodome, San Antonio, Texas, U.S.	
18	Draw	15–1–2	Oscar Negrete	SD	10	Aug 10, 2019	Verizon Theatre, Grand Prairie, Texas, U.S.	Retained WBA International and WBC-NABF bantamweight titles
17	Win	15–1–1	Oscar Negrete	SD	10	Apr 25, 2019	Fantasy Springs Resort Casino, Indio, California, U.S.	Won WBC-NABF and vacant WBA International bantamweight titles
16	Draw	14–1–1	Oscar Negrete	SD	10	Oct 4, 2018	The Hangar, Costa Mesa, California, U.S.	For WBC-NABF bantamweight title
15	Win	14–1	Isao Gonzalo Carranza	KO	5 (6), 1:36	Jun 1, 2018	Belasco Theater, Los Angeles, California, U.S.	
14	Loss	13–1	Lucas Fernandez	TKO	9 (10), 0:46	Mar 24, 2018	Complejo Ferial, Ponce, Puerto Rico	
13	Win	13–0	Carlos Maldonado	UD	8	Dec 14, 2017	Fantasy Springs Resort Casino, Indio, California, U.S.	
12	Win	12–0	Pedro Antonio Rodriguez	UD	6	Jul 14, 2017	Belasco Theater, Los Angeles, California, U.S.	
11	Win	11–0	Oscar Mojica	UD	8	Jun 17, 2017	Teatitos Championship Plaza, Frisco, Texas, U.S.	
10	Win	10–0	Marco Antonio Sanchez	KO	1 (6), 0:40	May 18, 2017	Casino Del Sol, Tucson, Arizona, U.S.	
9	Win	9–0	Victor Pasillas	KO	3 (8), 2:32	Feb 3, 2017	Belasco Theater, Los Angeles, California, U.S.	
8	Win	8–0	Felipe Rivas	UD	6	Nov 18, 2016	Fantasy Springs Resort Casino, Indio, California, U.S.	
7	Win	7–0	Bryan Bazan	RTD	4 (6), 0:19	Sep 17, 2016	AT&T Stadium, Arlington, Texas, U.S.	
6	Win	6–0	Sam Rodriguez	UD	6	Jun 11, 2016	The Rail Event Center, Salt Lake City, Utah, U.S.	
5	Win	5–0	Jorge Perez	KO	2 (6), 1:24	Apr 1, 2016	Belasco Theater, Los Angeles, California, U.S.	
4	Win	4–0	Juan Carlos Benavides	UD	6	Jan 29, 2016	Belasco Theater, Los Angeles, California, U.S.	
3	Win	3–0	Leonardo Reyes	KO	1 (6), 2:19	Dec 4, 2015	Belasco Theater, Los Angeles, California, U.S.	
2	Win	2–0	Saul Hernández	TKO	3 (4), 1:46	Oct 2, 2015	Belasco Theater, Los Angeles, California, U.S.	
1	Win	1–0	Temoatzin Landeros	SD	4	Aug 6, 2015	Belasco Theater, Los Angeles, California, U.S.	

== See also ==
- List of world super-flyweight boxing champions
- List of Mexican boxing world champions

Sporting positions
Regional boxing titles
Vacant Title last held by Mikhail Aloyan	WBA International bantamweight champion April 25, 2019 – January 2020	Vacant Title next held by Oscar Negrete
Preceded by Oscar Negrete	WBC-NABF bantamweight champion April 25, 2019 – January 2020	Vacant
Minor world boxing titles
Vacant Title last held by Chaiwat Buatkrathok	WBC Youth super flyweight champion Silver title June 17 – November 2017	Vacant Title next held by Damien Vazquez
Major world boxing titles
Preceded by Andrew Moloney	WBA super flyweight champion June 23, 2020 – June 24, 2034; Regular title until August 11, 2022	Succeeded by Kazuto Ioka
