= Jorge Gudiño =

Mexican basketball player (1920–1995)

Personal information
- Born: 2 June 1920 Mexico City, Mexico
- Died: 1995 (aged 74–75) Celaya, Mexico

Sport
- Sport: Basketball

Jorge Gudiño (2 June 1920 – 1995) was a Mexican basketball player. He competed in the men's tournament at the 1948 Summer Olympics.
