= Yoandris Salinas =

Cuban professional boxer from Ciego de Ávila

Personal information
- Born: September 20, 1985 (age 40)
Medal record
Men's Boxing
Representing Cuba
Pan American Games
Bronze medal – third place	2007 Rio	Flyweight
Central American and Caribbean Games
Silver medal – second place	2006 Cartagena	Flyweight

Yoandris Salinas (born September 20, 1985) is a Cuban professional boxer from Ciego de Ávila best known to medal repeatedly at flyweight in international amateur tournaments.

== Amateur ==
Salinas sensationally lost in 2005 to 16-year-old Roniel Iglesias but beat Andry Laffita 2006 and 2007 at the national championships and therefore represented Cuba at the 2006 Central American and Caribbean Games where he lost the final (6:5) to Dominican Juan Carlos Payano.

In 2006 he won a tournament called "Cuban Olympics" by edging out (smaller) junior flyweight superstar Zou Shiming from China in the final.

At the Pan American Games 2007 he lost due to head injury to eventual winner McWilliams Arroyo.

In 2008 he tried the bantamweight division at the national championships but lost early to Osieres Hernández. In this division he now has Olympic silver medalist Yankiel León in front of him.

== Professional ==
He turned professional in 2009 at junior-featherweight. He won 20 of his first 21 contests, the only blemish on his record being a draw against Nehomar Cermeno in Panama City in October 2011. He faced Scott Quigg for the WBA super-bantamweight championship in Manchester on 28 September 2013. The fight resulted in a draw.

== Professional boxing record ==
20 Wins(13 knockouts, 7 decisions), 1 Losses, 2 Draws
Res.	Record	Opponent	Type	Round	Date	Location	Notes
Loss	20–1–2	(Mexico) Enrique Quevedo	TKO	5 (10)	Jul 12, 2014	(United States) MGM Grand Garden Arena, Las Vegas, Nevada	
Draw	20–0–2	(United Kingdom) Scott Quigg	MD	12	2013-10-05	The O2 Arena, Greenwich, London, United Kingdom	For WBA World Super Bantamweight title.
Win	20–0–1	(Nicaragua) Eliecer Lanzas	UD	10	2012-10-06	Hotel Holiday Inn, Managua, Nicaragua	
Win	19–0–1	(Dominican Republic) Jose Anibal Cruz	TKO	4 (8)	2012-07-26	Coliseo Carlos 'Teo' Cruz, Santo Domingo, Dominican Republic	
Win	18–0–1	(Dominican Republic) Geyci Lorenzo	RTD	6 (8)	2012-07-23	Coliseo Carlos 'Teo' Cruz, Santo Domingo, Dominican Republic	
Win	17–0–1	(Nicaragua) Imer Velasquez	TKO	6 (9)	2012-05-19	Coliseo Miguel Grau, Callao, Peru	Retained WBA Fedebol Super Bantamweight title.
Win	16–0–1	(Nicaragua) Bismarck Alfaro	TKO	8 (10)	2012-02-17	Casino Pharaohs, Managua, Nicaragua	
Win	15–0–1	(Nicaragua) Danny Erazo	UD	8	2012-01-07	Palacio de los Deportes, Heredia, Costa Rica	
Win	14–0–1	(Dominican Republic) Aneudy Matos	TKO	2 (10)	2011-11-25	Coliseo Carlos 'Teo' Cruz, Santo Domingo, Dominican Republic	
Draw	13–0–1	(Venezuela) Nehomar Cermeno	SD	8	2011-10-22	Arena Roberto Durán, Panama City, Panama	For vacant NABA USA Super Bantamweight title.
Win	13–0	(Colombia) Felipe Almanza	KO	3 (8)	2011-08-12	(United States) Seminole Hard Rock Hotel and Casino, Hollywood, Florida	
Win	12–0	(Nicaragua) Carlos Rivas	UD	9	2011-07-30	San José, Costa Rica	Won vacant WBA Fedebol Super Bantamweight title.
Win	11–0	(Colombia) Jhon Alberto Molina	KO	3 (10)	2011-07-16	(United States) Greensboro, North Carolina	Won vacant WBC Latino Super Bantamweight title.
Win	10–0	(Mexico) Javier Castro	TKO	2 (8)	2011-07-09	Gimnasio Marcelino Gonzalez, Zacatecas, Zacatecas, Mexico	
Win	9–0	(United States) Robert DaLuz	UD	6	2011-06-24	(United States) Dade County Auditorium, Miami, Florida	
Win	8–0	(United States) Leshaun Blair	KO	1 (6)	2011-05-21	(United States) Rec Center, Wilson, North Carolina	
Win	7–0	(United States) David Green	TKO	6 (6)	2011-04-23	(United States) Miami-Dade County Fair & Expo, Miami, Florida	
Win	6–0	(The Bahamas) Ivan Moxey	KO	3 (6)	2011-04-02	(United States) Roger Dean Stadium, Jupiter, Florida	
Win	5–0	(Puerto Rico) Ángel López	TKO	1 (4)	2011-01-28	(United States) Double Tree Westshore Hotel, Tampa, Florida	
Win	4–0	(Mexico) Danny Aquino	SD	4	2010-12-07	(United States) Seminole Hard Rock Hotel and Casino, Hollywood, Florida	
Win	3–0	(Puerto Rico) Jesse Padilla	UD	4	2010-02-27	(United States) Electricians Union Hall, Miami, Florida	
Win	2–0	(Cuba) Yuniel Ramos	TKO	3 (4)	2010-02-05	(United States) Don Taft University Center, Fort Lauderdale, Florida	
Win	1–0	(Colombia) Felix Flores	UD	4	2009-12-04	(United States) LaCovacha, Miami, Florida	Professional debut.
