= Rafikjon Sultonov =

Uzbek boxer (born 1988)

Rafikjon Sultonov (born 19 February 1988) is an Uzbek amateur boxer who competed at the 2008 Summer Olympics at junior flyweight but was edged out by French southpaw Nordine Oubaali 7:8.
