= Manyo Plange =

Ghanaian boxer (born 1988)

Personal information
- Born: January 18, 1988 (age 38) Accra, Ghana
Medal record
Men's Boxing
Representing Ghana
All-Africa Games
Silver medal – second place	2007 Algiers	Light Flyweight

Jesse Manyo Plange (born January 18, 1988) is a Ghanaian boxer who won silver at the 2007 All-Africa Games and qualified for the 2008 Summer Olympics.

At the 2006 Commonwealth Games, he lost in the second round to a Welshman. At the 2007 All-Africa Games, he lost the final to Suleiman Bilali. At the World Championships he was defeated by Chinese Yang Bo. In the Olympic qualification he defeated Thomas Essomba, then lost to Namibian Japhet Uutoni, and finally won against Algerian Hamoud Boubraouet to gain the third and final qualifying spot. In Beijing at the Olympics he upset Harry Tanamor in his first match but lost to Paulo Carvalho.

== Professional boxing record ==
22 fights	21 wins	0 losses
By knockout	17	0
By decision	4	0
Draws	1	

No.	Result	Record	Opponent	Type	Round, time	Date	Location	Notes
22	Win	21–0–1	(Burkina Faso) Alexis Boureima Kabore	UD	8	Dec 12, 2020	Floxy place, Lekki AjahEpe Expressway, Lagos, Nigeria	
21	Win	20–0–1	(Nigeria) Sherif Kareem	TKO	4 (10)	Jan 31, 2020	Bukom Boxing Arena, Accra, Ghana	Won vacant WABU super flyweight title
20	Win	19–0–1	(Ghana) Edward Kambasa	TKO	5 (8)	Dec 27, 2019	Bukom Boxing Arena, Accra, Ghana	
19	Win	18–0–1	(Ghana) Emmanuel Otoo	UD	8	Jun 29, 2019	Accra Sports Stadium, Accra, Ghana	
18	Draw	17–0–1	(Philippines) Michael Dasmariñas	SD	10	Sep 29, 2018	Marina Bay Sands, Singapore	
17	Win	17–0	(Ghana) Hope Mawuli	RTD	3 (8), 3:00	Jun 19, 2018	Seconds Out Boxing Gymnasium, Accra, Ghana	
16	Win	16–0	(Ghana) Billy Quaye	TKO	3 (8)	Mar 30, 2018	T. Square Arena, Aflao, Ghana	
15	Win	15–0	(Ghana) Amadu Saidu	TKO	7 (8)	Nov 3, 2017	Aborigenes Beach Resort, Keta, Ghana	
14	Win	14–0	(Ghana) John Oblitey Commey	TKO	7 (8)	Jul 8, 2017	Seconds Out Boxing Gymnasium, Accra, Ghana	
13	Win	13–0	(Ghana) Amadu Saidu	UD	8	Nov 20, 2016	Seconds Out Boxing Gymnasium, Accra, Ghana	
12	Win	12–0	(Ghana) Billy Quaye	TKO	1 (8)	Jun 24, 2016	Seconds Out Boxing Gymnasium, Accra, Ghana	
11	Win	11–0	(Ghana) Albert Commey	RTD	4 (8), 3:00	May 15, 2014	Accra Sports Stadium, Accra, Ghana	
10	Win	10–0	(Ghana) Hope Mawuli	TKO	3 (8), 1:51	Sep 26, 2013	Will Power Boxing Complex, Accra, Ghana	
9	Win	9–0	(Ghana) Alfred Quaye	KO	2 (8), 2:20	Jul 20, 2013	Jubilee Pool House, Accra, Ghana	
8	Win	8–0	(Ghana) Kofi Ansah Raymond	TKO	6 (8), 0:22	Jun 22, 2013	Will Power Boxing Complex, Accra, Ghana	
7	Win	7–0	(Ghana) Moses Dodzi	KO	3 (6), 2:58	Mar 22, 2013	Accra Sports Stadium, Accra, Ghana	
6	Win	6–0	(Ghana) Solomon Ansah	TKO	6 (8), 0:19	Mar 2, 2013	City Engineers Yard, Accra, Ghana	
5	Win	5–0	(Ghana) Hope Bedi	KO	2 (8), 1:25	Feb 16, 2013	Will Power Boxing Complex, Accra, Ghana	
4	Win	4–0	(Nigeria) Felix Uzukwu	TKO	3 (6), 2:34	Jan 16, 2013	Will Power Boxing Complex, Accra, Ghana	
3	Win	3–0	(Ghana) Samuel Issah	TKO	3 (6), 0:45	Nov 9, 2012	Will Power Boxing Complex, Accra, Ghana	
2	Win	2–0	(Ghana) David Ameyaw	TKO	5 (6), 2:21	Oct 27, 2012	Will Power Boxing Complex, Accra, Ghana	
1	Win	1–0	(Ghana) James Nortey	UD	6	Oct 5, 2012	Will Power Boxing Complex, Accra, Ghana	
