= Nisar Khan (boxer) =

Pakistani boxer (born 1982)

Nisar Khan (Note: Urdu: نثار خان) (born 20 September 1982) is an amateur Pakistani boxer who fought in the middleweight (75 kg) class. His 2009 career included losing the opening bout of the World Boxing Championship, followed by a quarter-final defeat in the Asian Boxing Championship. In the first ever China Open Boxing Championship in 2010 he also fell in the quarter-final round, this was repeated in 2011. In 2010 he was chosen to be part of the Pakistan national team in the Commonwealth Games.
