= Oscar Negrete =

Colombian boxer (born 1987)

Personal information
- Nickname: Jaguar
- Nationality: Colombian
- Born: 18 July 1987 (age 38) Tierralta, Colombia
- Height: 5 ft 4 in (1.63 m)
- Weight: Bantamweight

Boxing career
- Reach: 67 in (170 cm)
- Stance: Orthodox

Boxing record
- Total fights: 24
- Wins: 19
- Win by KO: 7
- Losses: 3
- Draws: 2
Medal record
Men's Boxing
Representing Colombia
Central American and Caribbean Games
Bronze medal – third place	2006 Cartagena	Light flyweight
South American Games
Gold medal – first place	2010 Medellin	Light flyweight
Bronze medal – third place	2006 Buenos Aires	Light flyweight

Oscar Manuel Negrete Padilla (born 18 July 1987) is a Colombian born American boxer. He current NABF Bantamweight champion since June 30, 2017. At his amateur career best result was a gold medal at light-flyweight at the 2010 South American Games, defeated Alberto Melián in the final.

== Amateur career ==
At the 2006 Central American and Caribbean Games he lost by 7:12 in the semi-final against Odilon Zaleta. At the 2007 Pan American Games he lost at the quarter-final against Winston Mendez Montero. At the 2007 World Championships he lost early to Pál Bedák. At the second Olympic qualifier he won to Paulo Carvalho and lost against Yampier Hernández.

== Professional boxing record ==
24 fights	19 wins	3 losses
By knockout	7	0
By decision	12	3
Draws	2	

Key to abbreviations used for results
DQ	Disqualification	RTD	Corner retirement
KO	Knockout	SD	Split decision / split draw
MD	Majority decision / majority draw	TD	Technical decision / technical draw
NC	No contest	TKO	Technical knockout
PTS	Points decision	UD	Unanimous decision / unanimous draw

Boxing record
No.	Result	Record	Opponent	Type	Round(s), time	Date	Location	Notes
24	Loss	19–3–2	(United States) Ronny Rios	UD	10	13 Feb 2021	(United States) Fantasy Springs Casino, Indio, California	
23	Win	19–2–2	(Argentina) Alberto Melián	UD	10	6 Feb 2020	(United States) Fantasy Springs Casino, Indio, California	Won vacant WBA International bantamweight title
22	Draw	18–2–2	(United States) Joshua Franco	SD	10	10 Aug 2019	(United States) Verizon Theatre, Grand Prairie Texas	For WBA International and WBC–NABF bantamweight titles
21	Loss	18–2–1	(United States) Joshua Franco	SD	10	25 Apr 2019	(United States) Fantasy Springs Casino, Indio, California	Lost WBC–NABF bantamweight title For vacant WBA International bantamweight title
20	Draw	18–1–1	(United States) Joshua Franco	SD	10	4 Oct 2018	(United States) The Hangar, Costa Mesa, California	Retained WBC–NABF bantamweight title
19	Win	18–1	(Mexico) Diuhl Olguin	UD	8	6 Jul 2018	(United States) Belasco Theater, Los Angeles, California	
18	Lose	17–1	(Mexico) Rey Vargas	UD	12	2 Dec 2017	(United States) Madison Square Garden, New York	For WBC super bantamweight title
17	Win	17–0	(Mexico) Sergio Frias	RTD	8 (10) 3:00	30 Jun 2017	(United States) Fantasy Springs Casino, Indio, California	Won vacant WBC–NABF bantamweight title
16	Win	16–0	(Mexico) Victor Ruiz	UD	8	5 May 2017	(United States) MGM Grand Garden Arena, Las Vegas, Nevada	
15	Win	15–0	(Mexico) Raul Hidalgo	KO	4 (8) 2:49	2 Dec 2016	(United States) Belasco Theater, Los Angeles, California	
14	Win	14–0	(Mexico) José Bustos	UD	10	1 Jul 2016	(United States) Belasco Theater, Los Angeles, California	
13	Win	13–0	(Mexico) Neftali Campos	UD	8	4 Mar 2016	(United States) Belasco Theater, Los Angeles, California	
12	Win	12–0	(Mexico) Ernesto Guerrero	KO	3 (6) 2:51	4 Dec 2015	(United States) Belasco Theater, Los Angeles, California	
11	Win	11–0	(Mexico) Jose Estrella	RTD	6 (8) 3:00	18 Sep 2015	(United States) Belasco Theater, Los Angeles, California	
10	Win	10–0	(Mexico) Ramiro Robles	UD	8	2 Jul 2015	(United States) Belasco Theater, Los Angeles, California	
9	Win	9–0	(Mexico) Luis Maldonado	TD	5 (6) 0:22	7 May 2015	(United States) Belasco Theatre, Los Angeles, California	
8	Win	8–0	(United States) Fernando Fuentes	SD	6	27 Feb 2015	(United States) Fantasy Springs Casino, Indio, California	
7	Win	7–0	(Mexico) Salvador Perez	TKO	2 (4) 1:55	10 Oct 2014	(United States) Fantasy Springs Casino, Indio, California	
6	Win	6–0	(United States) Gabriel Braxton	TKO	1 (4) 2:28	11 Sep 2014	(United States) Hard Rock Hotel and Casino, Paradise, Nevada	
5	Win	5–0	(Mexico) Carlos Medina	UD	4	9 Jul 2014	(United States) Hard Rock Hotel and Casino, Paradise, Nevada	
4	Win	4–0	(Mexico) Pablo Cupul	RTD	2 (6) 3:00	6 Jun 2014	(United States) Fantasy Springs Casino, Indio, California	
3	Win	3–0	(Mexico) Jesus Domenech	SD	6	10 Aug 2013	(Mexico) Hipódromo Caliente, Arena Tecate, Tijuana, Baja California	
2	Win	2–0	(Mexico) Ramon Barboza	UD	4	28 Jun 2013	(Mexico) Forum Tecate, Tijuana, Baja California	
1	Win	1–0	(Mexico) Cristian Ciciliano	UD	4	24 May 2013	(Mexico) Casino Hipodromo Agua Caliente, Tijuana, Baja California	
