= Eduard Bermúdez =

Venezuelan boxer

Personal information
- Full name: Eduard Johan Bermúdez Salas
- Born: August 21, 1984 (age 41) Maracaibo, Venezuela

Sport
- Sport: Boxing
Medal record
Men's amateur boxing
Representing Venezuela
South American Games
Silver medal – second place	2006 Buenos Aires	Light Flyweight

Eduard Johan Bermúdez Salas (born August 21, 1984 in Maracaibo) is a Venezuelan light-flyweight amateur boxer who competed at the 2008 Summer Olympics. He has his debut to local boxer Zou Shiming.
