= Georgiy Chygayev =

Ukrainian boxer

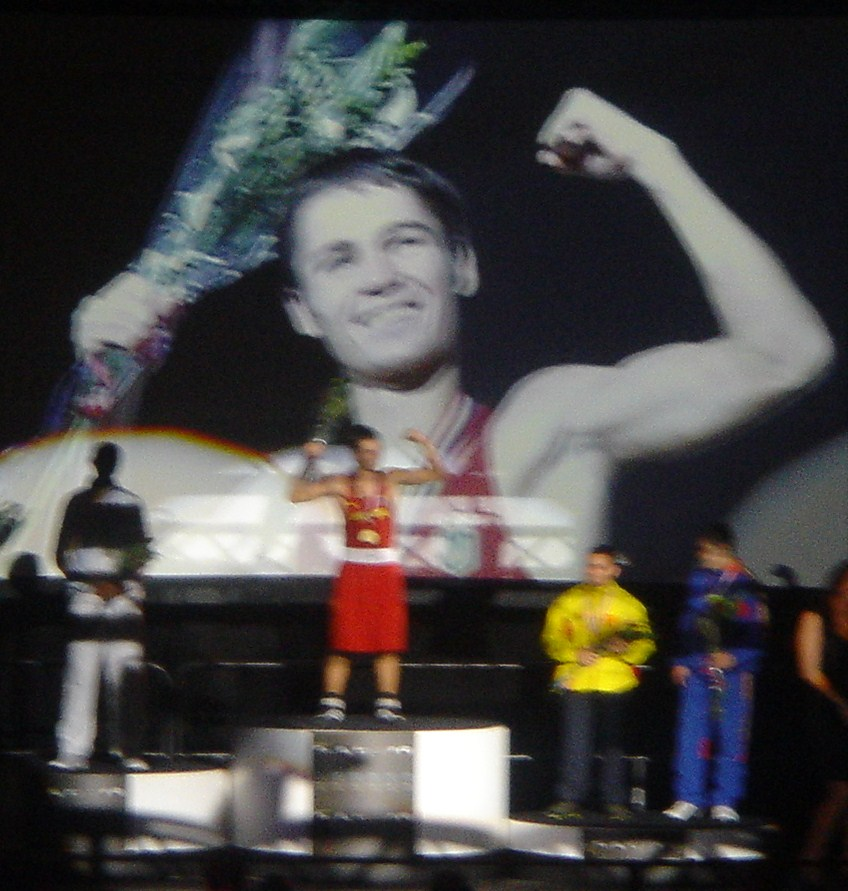
- Georgiy Chygayev

Personal information
- Full name: Георгій Чигаєв
- Nationality: Ukraine
- Born: October 19, 1983 (age 42) Lviv, Lviv Oblast, Ukrainian SSR, Soviet Union
- Height: 1.61 m (5 ft 3 in)
- Weight: 48 kg (106 lb)

Sport
- Sport: Boxing
- Weight class: Flyweight
- Club: Dynamo Lviv
Medal record
European Amateur Championships
Gold medal – first place	2008 Liverpool	Flyweight
Silver medal – second place	2010 Moscow	Bantamweight

Georgiy Chygayev (Ukrainian: Георгій Олександрович Чигаєв; born October 19, 1983, in Lviv) is a Ukrainian amateur boxer in the flyweight division who qualified for the 2008 Olympics and won a gold medal at the 2008 European championships.

== 2007 World Amateur Boxing Championships ==
At the 2007 World Amateur Boxing Championships in Chicago, Chygayev missed out on a bronze medal after he was defeated by France's Nordine Oubaali in the quarter-finals. Chygayev qualified for the 2008 Summer Olympics, however, by virtue of getting to the quarter-finals.

== 2008 Olympics ==
At the Olympics he lost his second bout to Cuban Yampier Hernández.

== 2008 European Championships ==
Chygayev went up to flyweight represented Ukraine at the 2008 European Amateur Boxing Championships in Liverpool, England. At the championships Campbell defeated Munin Veli in the semifinals before facing lanky Swede Salomo N'tuve in the final.

Despite being much shorter than his opponent the Ukrainian cruised to a 5:0 victory.
