= Nordine Oubaali =

French-Moroccan boxer (born 1986)

Personal information
- Nationality: French - Moroccan
- Born: 4 August 1986 (age 40) Lens, Pas-de-Calais, France
- Height: 5 ft 3 1/2 in (161 cm)
- Weight: Bantamweight

Boxing career
- Reach: 67 in (170 cm)
- Stance: Southpaw

Boxing record
- Total fights: 19
- Wins: 17
- Win by KO: 12
- Losses: 2
Medal record
Representing France
Men's Amateur boxing
European Union Championships
Bronze medal – third place	2007 Dublin	Light-flyweight
French National Championships
Silver medal – second place	2005 St Quentin	Light-flyweight
Gold medal – first place	2006 Saint-Quentin	Light-flyweight
Gold medal – first place	2007 Metz	Light-flyweight
Gold medal – first place	2008 Nice	Light-flyweight
Gold medal – first place	2009 Auxerre	Flyweight
Gold medal – first place	2010 Les Mazures	Flyweight
Mediterranean Games
Gold medal – first place	2009 Pescara	Flyweight
World Championships
Bronze medal – third place	2007 Chicago	Light-flyweight

Nordine Oubaali (Arabic: نوردين أوبالي) (born 4 August 1986) is a Moroccan-French former professional boxer who competed from 2014 to 2021. He held the WBC bantamweight title from 2019 to 2021. As an amateur he won a bronze medal in the light-flyweight division at the 2007 World Championships.

== Amateur career ==
Oubaali is the 13th child of 18 siblings in total. In 2006, he became French champion. At the 2007 World Championships the southpaw bested Arginian Junior Zarate (RSCO), Spaniard José Kelvin de la Nieve 33:12, and Georgiy Chygayev (UKR) 25–9. In the semis he was overwhelmed by Chinese top favorite Zou Shiming. At the 2008 Olympics, he beat Rafikjon Sultonov 8:7 and almost shocked local superstar Zou Shiming, but lost 3-3+ (jury decision). For the 2012 Summer Olympics, he moved up to flyweight (52 kg). He beat Ajmal Faisal in the first round, Rau'Shee Warren in the second but then lost to Ireland's Michael Conlan in the quarterfinal.

== Professional career ==
=== Early career ===
Oubaali made his professional debut against Sergey Tasimov on March 20, 2014. He won the fight by unanimous decision. Oubaali amassed an 11–0 record during the next two years, with eight victories coming by way of stoppage. Oubaali faced Alejandro Hernandez on June 2, 2017, for the vacant WBC Silver bantamweight title. He won the fight by a tenth-round technical knockout. He made his first and only title defense against Mark Anthony Geraldo on December 16, 2017, whom he beat by a seventh-round knockout. Oubali faced Luis Melendez in a non-title bout on April 7, 2018. He won the fight by a second-round knockout.

=== WBC Bantamweight champion ===
==== Oubaali vs. Warren ====
On November 21, 2018, it was announced by the WBC that Nordine Oubaali would face Rau'shee Warren for the vacant WBC bantamweight title. Warren was ranked #1 by the WBC at bantamweight. The bout was scheduled for the undercard of the PBC on Fox card on December 22, 2018, at the Barclays Center in New York City. It was not slated for network broadcast. The two of them previously fought as amateurs in the first round of the 2012 Olympic Games, with Oubaali winning by decision. The bout was postponed on December 4, 2018, to allow Oubaali's coach and brother Ali to corner Estelle Mossely on December 22. The Oubaali and Warren fight was instead rescheduled for the Manny Pacquiao vs. Adrien Broner undercard on January 19, 2019, at the MGM Grand Garden Arena in Las Vegas, Nevada. Oubaali was a -379 betting favorite, while Warren entered the fight as a +319 underdog.

Oubaali captured the vacant title by unanimous decision, with scores of 115–113, 116–112, and 117–111. He spent the majority of the fight pressuring and controlling the pace, while Warren found most success in the fifth, seventh and eleventh rounds. Warren acknowledged the flow of the fight in his post-fight interview, stating: "He wanted it more...He had his foot on the gas".

==== Oubaali vs. Villanueva ====
Oubaali was scheduled to make the first defense of his WBC bantamweight title against the one-time IBF and WBO title challenger Arthur Villanueva. Villanueva was ranked number 15 by the WBC at bantamweight. The fight was scheduled as the main event of an ESPN+ card, which took place on July 6, 2019, at the Barys Arena in Nur-Sultan, Kazakhstan. Oubaali was a significant -3500 favorite heading into the bout, while Villanueva came in as a +1200 underdog. He won the fight by a sixth-round stoppage. Oubaali dominated from the start, causing a swelling to appear above Villanueva's left eye and knocking the Philippine fighter with an uppercut-right hook combination in the sixth round. Villanueva retired from the fight at the end of the sixth round.

==== Oubaali vs. Inoue ====
Oubaali was scheduled to make his second WBC bantamweight title defense against the interim bantamweight champion Takuma Inoue. Inoue achieved the status of a mandatory challenger on September 11, 2018, with a unanimous decision victory against Mark John Yap. As he was forced to wait for the result of the Oubaali and Warren fight, Inoue furthermore fought and defeated Petch Sor Chitpattana on December 30, 2018, to become the WBC interim bantamweight champion. The fight between Oubaali and Inoue was scheduled for the undercard of the Naoya Inoue and Nonito Donaire WBSS final, which was held on November 7, 2019, at the Saitama Super Arena in Saitama, Japan. Oubaali outpointed Inoue to retain his WBC title. Oubaali scored the sole knockdown of the fight in the third round, when he dropped Inoue with a left hook. Although he was unable to finish his opponent, Oubaali nonetheless won by a comfortable decision, with scores of 117–110, 120–107 and 115–112.

==== Oubaali vs. Donaire, Martinez, and Retirement ====
Oubaali was scheduled to make his third WBC title defense against the former four-weight world champion Nonito Donaire. Donaire was ranked number 1 by the WBC at bantamweight. The fight was scheduled for December 12, 2020, at the Mohegan Sun Arena in Uncasville, Connecticut. Oubaali withdrew from the fight on November 13, 2020, following a positive COVID-19 test. He was replaced by Emmanuel Rodríguez, who was to face Donaire on December 19, 2020. On December 9, 2020, Donaire was forced to withdraw from the Rodriguez fight, as he had tested positive for COVID-19 as well. The fight between Oubaali and Donaire was rescheduled for May 29, 2021, as the main event of the PBC card held at the Dignity Health Sports Park in Carson, California. Donaire won the fight by a fourth-round knockout. Oubaali was knocked down twice in the third round, before getting finished with a hook-straight-uppercut combination in the fourth round.

Oubaali officially announced his retirement from the sport on April 5, 2022. However, he would return to the ring on April 29, 2023 against journeyman Ricardo Martinez, suffering two knockdowns en route to a split-decision loss.

== Professional boxing record ==
19 fights	17 wins	2 losses
By knockout	12	1
By decision	5	1

No.	Result	Record	Opponent	Type	Round, time	Date	Location	Notes
19	Loss	17–2	Ricardo Martinez	SD	8	29 Apr 2023	Salle Gayant, Douai, France	
18	Loss	17–1	Nonito Donaire	KO	4 (12), 1:52	29 May 2021	Dignity Health Sports Park, Carson, California, US	Lost WBC bantamweight title
17	Win	17–0	Takuma Inoue	UD	12	7 Nov 2019	Super Arena, Saitama, Japan	Retained WBC bantamweight title
16	Win	16–0	Arthur Villanueva	RTD	6 (12), 3:00	6 Jul 2019	Barys Arena, Nur-Sultan, Kazakhstan	Retained WBC bantamweight title
15	Win	15–0	Rau'shee Warren	UD	12	19 Jan 2019	MGM Grand Garden Arena, Paradise, Nevada, US	Won vacant WBC bantamweight title
14	Win	14–0	Luis Melendez	KO	2 (10), 1:43	7 Apr 2018	Dome de Paris-Palais des Sports, Paris, France	
13	Win	13–0	Mark Anthony Geraldo	KO	7 (12), 1:25	16 Dec 2017	La Seine Musicale, Boulogne-Billancourt, France	Retained WBC Silver bantamweight title
12	Win	12–0	Alejandro Hernandez	TKO	10 (12), 0:33	2 Jun 2017	Palais des Sports Porte de Versailles, Paris, France	Won vacant WBC Silver bantamweight title
11	Win	11–0	Julio César Miranda	TKO	12 (12), 2:46	17 Dec 2016	Gymnase du Clos de l'Arche, Noisy-le-Grand, France	Won WBA Inter-Continental bantamweight title
10	Win	10–0	Iran Diaz	KO	7 (10), 2:38	27 May 2016	Cirque d'hiver, Paris, France	
9	Win	9–0	Reynaldo Cajina	UD	6	19 Feb 2016	Cirque d'hiver, Paris, France	
8	Win	8–0	Gagi Edisherashvili	TKO	1 (8)	5 Dec 2015	Salle Joliot Curie, Fontenay-sous-Bois, France	
7	Win	7–0	Mihaly Telekfi	KO	1 (6)	30 Oct 2015	Salle la Soucoupe, Saint-Nazaire, France	
6	Win	6–0	Artur Movsesian	TKO	1 (6)	13 Jun 2015	Cirque d'hiver, Paris, France	
5	Win	5–0	Hassan Azaouagh	KO	1 (10)	2 May 2015	Espace Francois Mitterrand, Hénin-Beaumont, France	Won vacant French bantamweight title
4	Win	4–0	Nugzar Chavchavadze	TKO	5 (8)	23 Jan 2015	Salle la Soucoupe, Saint-Nazaire, France	
3	Win	3–0	Faycal Messaoudene	UD	6	15 Nov 2014	Gymnase Michel Ricard, Rueil-Malmaison, France	
2	Win	2–0	Norredine Dahou	TKO	1 (6)	24 Oct 2014	Salle la Soucoupe, Saint-Nazaire, France	
1	Win	1–0	Sergey Tasimov	UD	4	20 Mar 2014	555 Famous Club, Marrakesh, Morocco	

== See also ==
- List of world bantamweight boxing champions

Sporting positions
World boxing titles
Vacant Title last held by Luis Nery	WBC bantamweight champion 19 January 2019 – 13 November 2020; Status changed to champion in recess	Vacant Title next held by Himself
Vacant Title last held by Himself	WBC bantamweight champion 10 January 2021 – 29 May 2021	Succeeded by Nonito Donaire
Honorary boxing titles
New title	WBC bantamweight champion In recess 25 November 2020 – 10 January 2021; Reinstated	Vacant
