= Kevin Betancourt =

Venezuelan boxer

Personal information
- Born: 2 October 1986 (age 39) Valle de la Pascua, Venezuela

Sport
- Sport: Boxing
Medal record
Men's Boxing
Representing Venezuela
Pan American Games
Silver medal – second place	2007 Rio de Janeiro	Light Flyweight

Kenin José Betancourt Velásquez (born 2 October 1986) is a Venezuelan amateur boxer best known to win a silver medal in the light flyweight division at the 2007 Pan American Games. In the final, he lost to southpaw Luis Yáñez from the United States.
