= Yampier Hernández =

Cuban Olympic boxer (b. 1984)

Medal record

Representing Cuba

Men's Boxing

2008 Olympic Games
Bronze medal – third place	2008 Beijing	Light Flyweight

Yampier Hernández Gonzales (born 30 August 1984 in Havana) is a Cuban boxer who won Bronze at the 2008 Olympics at Light Flyweight.

== Boxing career ==
Southpaw Hernández became Cuba' s number one only after 2004 Olympic Champion Yan Bartelemí, who had beaten him numerous times, had defected. He won the national championship in 2007 and 2008 but didn't medal at the PanAm Games 2007 after losing to Luis Yanez.

At the second qualifier in 2008, he lost to Winston Mendez Montero but beat Oscar Negrete in the third place bout.

He lost his Olympic semifinal to Mongol Pürevdorjiin Serdamba and won Bronze.

=== Olympic Games ===
2008 (as a Light Flyweight)

- Defeated Sherali Dostiev (Tajikistan) 12–1
- Defeated Georgiy Chygayev (Ukraine) 21–3
- Defeated Paulo Carvalho (Brazil) 21–6
- Lost to Pürevdorjiin Serdamba (Mongolia) 8-8
