= Łukasz Maszczyk =

Polish boxer

Personal information
- Nickname: Angel
- Nationality: Polish
- Born: 15 December 1984 (age 41) Myszków, Poland
- Weight: Featherweight

Boxing career
- Stance: Orthodox

Boxing record
- Total fights: 5
- Wins: 4
- Win by KO: 3
- Losses: 1
- Draws: 0
Medal record
Men's boxing
Representing Poland
EU Amateur Championships
Gold medal – first place	2006 Pecs	Light Flyweight
Silver medal – second place	2004 Madrid	Light Flyweight
Silver medal – second place	2009 Odense	Light Flyweight
Bronze medal – third place	2005 Cagliari	Light Flyweight
Bronze medal – third place	2007 Cetniewo	Light Flyweight

Łukasz Adam Maszczyk (born 15 December 1984 in Myszków) is a Polish amateur boxer who qualified for the 2008 Olympics at Light-Flyweight.

== Career ==
At the World Championships 2007 Maszczyk lost in the opening rounds to Georgiy Chygayev. He later qualified for the Olympics by beating Belarusian boxer Anton Bekish in the semi-final of a European qualifying tournament.

== Professional record ==
5 fights, 4 wins (3 knockouts), 1 losses (0 knockouts), 0 draw
Result	Record	Opponent	Type	Round, time	Date	Location	Notes
Loss	4-1	(Poland) Krzysztof Cieślak	UD	8	2013-08-18	(Poland) Amfiteatr, Misdroy	
Win	4-0	(Hungary) Andras Varga	UD	6	2013-03-23	(Poland) Hala Sportowa, ul. Zuzlowa 4, Częstochowa	
Win	3-0	(Romania) Oszkar Fiko	TKO	2 (4), 1:25	2012-12-08	(Poland) Spodek, Katowice	
Win	2-0	(Belarus) Artsem Abmiotka	TKO	1 (4), 1:58	2013-09-30	(Poland) Hala MOSiR, Nowy Dwór Mazowiecki	
Win	1-0	(Poland) Piotr Filipkowski	TKO	1 (4), 2:25	2012-08-18	(Poland) Amfiteatr, Międzyzdroje	
