= Japhet Uutoni =

Namibian boxer (born 1979)

Personal information
- Nicknames: The Namibian Lion; Slow Poison
- Nationality: Namibian
- Born: Japhet Uutoni; 29 June 1979 (age 47) Windhoek, Namibia
- Height: 5 ft 9 in (175 cm)
- Weight: Light flyweight

Boxing career

Boxing record
- Total fights: 14
- Wins: 12
- Win by KO: 5
- Losses: 2
Medal record
Men's amateur boxing
Representing Namibia
Commonwealth Games
Gold medal – first place	2006 Melbourne	Light flyweight
Silver medal – second place	2010 Delhi	Light flyweight

Japhet Uutoni (also spelled Jafet Uutoni; born 29 June 1979) is a Namibian professional boxer in the light flyweight division. He was the 2005 Namibian sportsperson of the year in the Namibian newspaper and won a gold medal at the 2006 Commonwealth Games by defeating England's Darren Langley on points (37–24). He also won a silver medal at the 2010 Commonwealth Games.

Uutoni competes at the 48 kg weightclass and qualified for the 2008 Summer Olympics by beating Manyo Plange. He was a member of the team that competed for Africa at the 2005 Boxing World Cup in Moscow, Russia.

== Professional boxing record ==
14 fights	12 wins	2 losses
By knockout	5	1
By decision	7	1

No.	Result	Record	Opponent	Type	Round, time	Date	Location	Notes
14	Loss	12–2	(Puerto Rico) Ángel Acosta	TKO	10 (12), 1:01	11 Feb 2017	Coliseo Roger L. Mendoza, Caguas, Puerto Rico	WBO light flyweight title eliminator
13	Win	12–1	(Tanzania) Twalib Tuwa	TKO	3 (12)	8 Oct 2016	Windhoek Country Club Resort, Windhoek, Namibia	Retain WBO International light flyweight title
12	Win	11–1	(South Africa) Bongani Silila	TKO	11 (12)	29 Apr 2016	Ngoako Ramatlhodi Sports Complex, Seshego, Limpopo, South Africa	vacant WBO International light flyweight title
11	Win	10–1	(South Africa) Khanyakude Mukansi	UD	6	1 Aug 2015	Ramatex Factory, Windhoek, Namibia	
10	Win	9–1	(South Africa) Sibusiso Twani	UD	10	20 Mar 2015	Ramatex Factory, Windhoek, Namibia	
9	Win	8–1	(Namibia) Abmerk Shindjuu	UD	12	6 Dec 2014	Windhoek Country Club Resort, Windhoek, Namibia	Won WBO Africa flyweight title
8	Loss	7–1	(Namibia) Abmerk Shindjuu	SD	12	26 Jul 2014	Windhoek Country Club Resort, Windhoek, Namibia	For WBO Africa flyweighttitle
7	Win	7–0	(Namibia) Neaman Amagola	TKO	3 (6)	17 May 2014	Omuthiya Park, Oshikoto, Namibia	
6	Win	6–0	(Namibia) Lukusa Kashindi	TKO	1 (6), 0:52	17 May 2014	Olufuko Centre, Outapi, Namibia	
5	Win	5–0	(Botswana) Peter Pelane	PTS	6 (6)	6 Dec 2013	Windhoek Country Club Resort, Windhoek, Namibia	
4	Win	4–0	(Namibia) Neaman Amagola	UD	4	5 Oct 2013	Ramatex Factory, Windhoek, Namibia	
3	Win	3–0	(Botswana) Kgomotso Bok	RTD	3 (4), 3:00	5 Jul 2013	Ramatex Factory, Windhoek, Namibia	
2	Win	2–0	(Namibia) Celestinus Haingura	UD	4	2 Mar 2013	Ramatex Factory, Windhoek, Namibia	
1	Win	1–0	(Zimbabwe) Ntando Sibanda	UD	4	3 Nov 2012	Ramatex Factory, Windhoek, Namibia	Pro debut for Uutoni

== Sources ==
- Results of 2006 Commonwealth Games - Boxing, 48 Kg
- Japhet Uutoni at the African People Database
- Evans, Hilary; Gjerde, Arild; Heijmans, Jeroen; Mallon, Bill; et al. "Jafet Uutoni". Olympics at Sports-Reference.com. Sports Reference LLC. Archived from the original on 6 July 2012.
- Namibian Sport Year in Review, 22 December 2006, Namibian.com.na (see sports section)
