= Luis Yáñez =

American boxer (born 1988)

Personal information
- Nickname: The Latin Legend
- Nationality: American
- Born: October 25, 1988 (age 37) Duncanville, Texas, U.S.
- Height: 5 ft 3 in (160 cm)
- Weight: Light Flyweight (108 lb); Super Flyweight (115 lb)

Boxing career
- Stance: Southpaw

Boxing record
- Total fights: 9
- Wins: 7
- Win by KO: 0
- Losses: 1
- Draws: 1
- No contests: 0
Medal record
Pan American Games
Gold medal – first place	2007 Rio	Light Flyweight

Luis Yáñez (pronounced [ˈlwis ˈɟ͡ʝaɲes]; born October 25, 1988) is an American professional boxer. As an amateur, he won a gold medal at the 2007 Pan American Games at junior flyweight and competed at the 2008 Summer Olympics.

== Amateur career ==
Southpaw Yanez who hails from Duncanville, Texas was a hyperactive kid who was taken to the gym by his father in 1997 at the age of 8 when he had trouble getting his son to listen and settle down. He wanted him to receive structure, release energy in a positive environment and instill discipline.

When Yanez was 14, he started compiling referrals from school administrators for disrupting class. After he had received 30 referrals, his coach Rodarte gave him an ultimatum to straighten up in school or he wouldn't be able to come to the gym.

Yanez won a silver medal at the Cadet(U17) World Championships in 2005 and a gold medal at the Junior Olympics. In 2006 he became the US champion and won the National Golden Gloves, in 2007 he repeated both wins.

In Brazil at the PanAm games 2007 he reached the final by beating two opponents who had beaten him earlier the same year – Cuba's Yampier Hernandez in the quarterfinals and Dominican Wilton Mendez in the semifinals and also bested Venezuelan Kevin Betancourt, ranked 58th in the world for the gold medal.

He won the US Olympic trials in August 2007.

Yanez didn't lose a fight in the US Open competition, going 92-0. In the past three years, he's 26-3 in international competition.

In August 2007, Yanez became the first boxer ever from Dallas, TX. to qualify for the Olympics. He was the third boxer from the Dallas/Ft. Worth area, behind Donald Curry and Sergio Reyes of Ft. Worth. At the 2007 World Amateur Boxing Championships in Chicago he qualified for the Olympics for good but lost surprisingly to fellow southpaw and eventual silver medalist Harry Tanamor from the Philippines.

In November 2007, Yanez earned his ticket into the 2008 Olympics by "advancing to the quarterfinals of the AIBA World Championships in Chicago." In a bout against Australia's Stephen Sutherland, the referee was forced to stop the fight in the second round after Yanez caused three standing eight counts. With this win, Yanez earned his official place as a light flyweight (106 pounds) in the 2008 Olympics to be hosted in Beijing, China. At the meeting in China in November 2007 he was soundly defeated by world champ Zou Shiming.

On July 16, 2008, Yanez was reinstated to the U.S. Olympic team after having been removed to the team for missing three weeks of training camp in Colorado. On August 13, 2008 Yanez won his first bout against Kelvin de la Nieve of Spain. The final score recorded reflected Yanez in the lead, outscoring de la Nieve 12-9. Then he lost to eventual Mongolian runner-up Pürevdorjiin Serdamba 7:8.

== Professional career ==
Following the 2008 Olympics, Yanez announced that he would turn professional. His first professional fight took place on Friday, February 20 versus Julio Cesar Valadez of San Antonio at the American Airlines Center in Dallas, Texas. Yanez won his professional debut by majority decision.

Yanez will begin his professional career fighting in the bantamweight division (118 pounds), more than twelve pounds heavier than his amateur weight class of light flyweight (48 kilograms). Yanez lost in his last fight to Alan Salazar Blanco by unanimous decision

== Professional boxing record ==
7 Wins (0 knockouts, 7 decisions), 1 Losses, 1 Draws
Res.	Record	Opponent	Type	Rd., Time	Date	Location	Notes	
loss 7-1 Alan Salazar Blanco UD Deportivo Trabajadores del Metro, Iztacalco	Win	7–0	(Kyrgyzstan) Timur Shailezov	SD	8	2013-04-19	(United States) Cendera Center, El Paso, Texas	Won vacant WBC USNBC Super Flyweight title.
Win	6–0	(United States) Joseph Rios	SD	8	2012-03-24	(United States) La Villita Maverick Plaza, San Antonio, Texas	Retained USA Texas State Super Flyweight title.	
Win	5–0	(United States) Jamal Parram	UD	6	2012-02-17	(United States) College Park Center, Arlington, Texas		
Draw	4–0	(United States) Joseph Rios	PTS	6	2011-02-04	(United States) Fort Worth Convention Center, Fort Worth, Texas		
Win	4–0	(Mexico) Samuel Gutiérrez	UD	6	2010-02-09	(United States) Fair Park, Dallas, Texas		
Win	3–0	(Mexico) José Manuel García	UD	6	2009-08-15	(United States) The Fairmont Dallas Hotel, Dallas, Texas	Won vacant USA Texas State Super Flyweight title.	
Win	2–0	(United States) Joseph Rios	UD	6	2009-06-19	(United States) Dr Pepper Arena, Frisco, Texas		
Win	1–0	(Mexico) Julio Valadez	MD	4	2009-02-20	(United States) American Airlines Center, Dallas, Texas		
