= Paulo Carvalho (boxer) =

Brazilian boxer

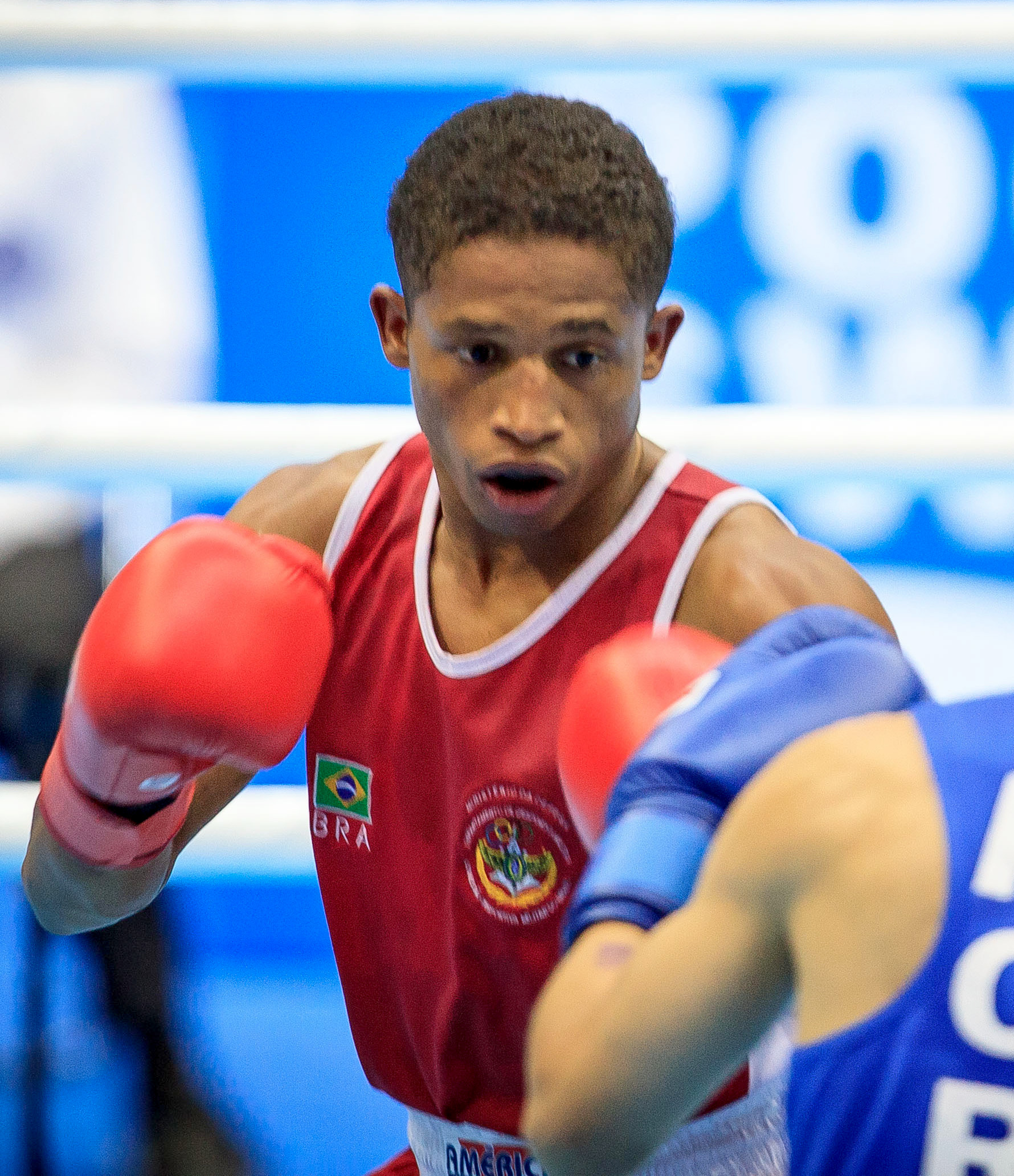
- Carvalho at the 2015 Military World Games

Personal information
- Born: 26 February 1986 (age 40) Salvador, Brazil
- Height: 160 cm (5 ft 3 in)

Sport
- Sport: Boxing
- Club: Brazilian Navy
Medal record
Representing Brazil
South American Games
Bronze medal – third place	2006 Buenos Aires	-48 kg
Military World Games
Silver medal – second place	2015 Mungyeong	-49 kg

Paulo Santos Carvalho (born 26 February 1986) is a Brazilian amateur flyweight boxer who won a bronze medal at the 2006 South American Games. He competed at the 2008 Summer Olympics but was eliminated in the third bout.

== Career ==
=== World Series of Boxing record ===
3 fights	0 wins	3 losses
By knockout	0	1
By decision	0	2

No.	Result	Record	Team	Opponent (Team)	Type	Round, time	Date	Location	Notes
2	Loss	0–2	Miami Gallos	(Colombia) Oscar Negrete (Mexico City Guerreros)	PTS	5	27 Feb 2011	Miami, United States	
1	Loss	0–1	Miami Gallos	(United States) Ernesto Garza III (Memphis Force)	PTS	5	5 Jan 2011	Miami, United States	WSB debut
