= Boxing at the 2012 Summer Olympics – Qualification =

Qualification for the Boxing Events at the 2012 Summer Olympics is based on the WBS Individual Championships, the 2011 World Championships and 5 Continental Qualifying Events to be held in 2012. Qualification for the women's events was at the World Championships only.

== Qualification summary ==
| NOC | Men | | | | | | | | | | Women | | | Total |
| NOC | 49 | 52 | 56 | 60 | 64 | 69 | 75 | 81 | 91 | +91 | 51 | 60 | 75 | Total |
|---|---|---|---|---|---|---|---|---|---|---|---|---|---|---|
| Afghanistan | | X | | | | | | | | | | | | 1 |
| Algeria | X | X | X | X | | X | X | X | X | | | | | 8 |
| Angola | | | | | | | | | X | | | | | 1 |
| Argentina | | | X | | | | | | X | | | | | 2 |
| Armenia | | | | | | | X | | | | | | | 1 |
| Australia | X | X | X | X | X | X | X | X | X | X | | | X | 11 |
| Azerbaijan | | X | X | | X | | X | X | X | X | | | X | 8 |
| Belarus | | | | X | | | | X | X | | | | | 3 |
| Benin | | | | X | | | | | | | | | | 1 |
| Botswana | | X | | | | | | | | | | | | 1 |
| Brazil | | X | X | X | X | X | X | X | | | X | X | X | 10 |
| Bulgaria | X | | X | | | | | | X | | X | | | 4 |
| Cameroon | X | | | X | X | | | X | | X | | | | 5 |
| Canada | | | | | | X | | | | X | | | X | 3 |
| China | X | | | X | | X | | X | X | X | X | X | X | 9 |
| Colombia | | | | X | X | | | X | | | | | | 3 |
| Cuba | X | X | X | X | X | | | X | X | X | | | | 8 |
| Czech Republic | | | | | X | | | | | | | | | 1 |
| Denmark | | | X | | | | | | | | | | | 1 |
| Dominican Republic | | | X | X | | | X | | | | | | | 3 |
| Democratic Republic of the Congo | | | | | | | | | | X | | | | 1 |
| Ecuador | X | | | | X | X | X | X | X | X | | | | 7 |
| Egypt | X | X | | X | X | | X | | | | | | | 5 |
| France | X | X | | X | | X | | | | X | | | | 5 |
| Gabon | | | X | | | X | | | | | | | | 2 |
| Georgia | | | X | | | | | | | | | | | 1 |
| Germany | | | | | | X | X | X | | X | | | | 4 |
| Ghana | X | X | X | | | | | | | | | | | 3 |
| Great Britain | | X | X | X | X | X | X | | | X | X | X | X | 10 |
| Honduras | X | | | | | | | | | | | | | 1 |
| Hungary | | | | X | X | | X | | | | | | | 3 |
| India | X | | X | X | X | X | X | X | | | X | | | 8 |
| Iran | | | | | X | X | | X | X | | | | | 4 |
| Iraq | | | | | | X | | | | | | | | 1 |
| Ireland | X | X | X | | | X | X | | | | | X | | 6 |
| Italy | X | X | X | X | X | | | | X | X | | | | 7 |
| Japan | | X | X | | | X | X | | | | | | | 4 |
| Jordan | | | | | | | | X | | | | | | 1 |
| Kazakhstan | X | X | X | X | X | X | X | X | | X | | X | X | 11 |
| Kenya | | X | | | | | | | | | | | X | 2 |
| Lithuania | | | | X | | X | | | | | | | | 2 |
| Mauritius | | X | | | X | | | | | | | | | 2 |
| Mexico | | | X | | | X | | | | | | | | 2 |
| Moldova | | | | | | X | | | | | | | | 1 |
| Mongolia | X | X | | | X | X | | | | | | | | 4 |
| Montenegro | | | | | | | | X | | | | | | 1 |
| Morocco | X | | X | | X | X | X | X | | X | | X | | 8 |
| Mozambique | X | | | | | | | | | | | | | 1 |
| Namibia | | | X | | | | X | | | | | | | 2 |
| New Zealand | | | | | | | | | | | X | X | | 2 |
| Nicaragua | | | | | | | | X | | | | | | 1 |
| Niger | | | | | | X | | | | | | | | 1 |
| Nigeria | | | | | | | X | X | | | | | X | 3 |
| North Korea | | X | | | | | | | | | X | | | 2 |
| Panama | | | | X | | | | | | | | | | 1 |
| Philippines | X | | | | | | | | | | | | | 1 |
| Poland | | | | | | | | | | | X | | | 1 |
| Puerto Rico | X | X | | X | X | | X | | | | | | | 5 |
| Romania | | | | | | | X | | | | | X | | 2 |
| Russia | X | X | X | | | X | | X | X | X | X | X | X | 10 |
| Serbia | | | | | | | X | | | | | | | 1 |
| Seychelles | | | | X | | | | | | | | | | 1 |
| South Africa | | | X | | | X | | | | | | | | 2 |
| South Korea | X | | | X | | | | | | | | | | 2 |
| Spain | X | | | | X | | | | | | | | | 2 |
| Sweden | | X | | | X | | | | | | | | X | 3 |
| Syria | | | X | | | | | | | | | | | 1 |
| Tanzania | | | | | | X | | | | | | | | 1 |
| Tajikistan | | | X | | | | X | X | | | | X | | 4 |
| Thailand | X | X | | X | | | | | | | | | | 3 |
| Trinidad and Tobago | X | | | | | | | | | | | | | 1 |
| Tunisia | | | | X | X | | | X | | | X | X | | 5 |
| Turkey | X | X | | X | X | | X | X | | | | | | 6 |
| Turkmenistan | | | | | X | | X | | | | | | | 2 |
| Ukraine | | | X | X | X | X | X | X | X | | | | | 7 |
| United States | | X | X | X | X | X | X | X | X | X | X | X | X | 12 |
| Uzbekistan | | X | X | X | X | | X | X | | | | | | 6 |
| Venezuela | | | | | | X | X | | | | X | | | 3 |
| Zambia | | | | | X | | | | | | | | | 1 |
| Total: 79 NOCs | 26 | 26 | 28 | 28 | 28 | 28 | 28 | 26 | 15 | 16 | 12 | 12 | 12 | 285 |

== Qualification timeline ==
| Event | Date | Venue |
|---|---|---|
| World Series of Boxing Individual Championships | 27–28 May 2011 | Guizhou, China |
| 2011 World Amateur Boxing Championships | 26 September – 8 October 2011 | Baku, Azerbaijan |
| Olympic Qualifying Event – Oceania | 21–25 March 2012 | Canberra, Australia |
| Olympic Qualifying Event – Asia | 5–12 April 2012 | Astana, Kazakhstan |
| Olympic Qualifying Event – Europe | 15–21 April 2012 | Trabzon, Turkey |
| Olympic Qualifying Event – Africa | 28 April – 5 May 2012 | Casablanca, Morocco |
| Olympic Qualifying Event – America | 5–12 May 2012 | Rio de Janeiro, Brazil |
| 2012 AIBA Women's World Boxing Championships | 11–19 May 2012 | Qinhuangdao, China |

== Men's events ==
Olympic Qualification System per Continent and by Weight Category.

| Weight | Africa | America | Asia | Europe | Oceania | Total |
|---|---|---|---|---|---|---|
| 49 kg | 6 | 4 (1) | 6 | 8 | 1 | 26 |
| 52 kg | 6 | 4 (1) | 6 | 8 | 1 | 26 |
| 56 kg | 6 | 6 | 6 | 9 | 1 | 28 |
| 60 kg | 6 | 6 | 6 (1) | 8 | 1 | 28 |
| 64 kg | 6 | 6 | 6 | 8 (1) | 1 | 28 |
| 69 kg | 6 | 6 | 6 (1) | 8 | 1 | 28 |
| 75 kg | 5 | 6 | 7 | 9 | 1 | 28 |
| 81 kg | 5 | 6 | 7 | 6 (1) | 1 | 26 |
| 91 kg | 2 (1) | 4 | 2 | 6 | 1 | 16 |
| +91 kg | 2 (1) | 4 | 2 | 6 | 1 | 16 |
| Total | 52 | 54 | 56 | 78 | 10 | 250 |

- ( ) Tripartite Selection Quota

=== Light flyweight (49 kg) ===
| Competition | Vacancies | Qualified |
|---|---|---|
| WSB Individual Championships | 0 | — |
| 2011 World Championships | 10 | Zou Shiming (CHN); Shin Jong-hun (KOR); David Ayrapetyan (RUS); Pürevdorjiin Serdamba (MGL); Kaew Pongprayoon (THA); Devendro Singh (IND); José Kelvin de la Nieve (ESP); Yosvany Veitía (CUB); Mark Anthony Barriga (PHI); Jérémy Beccu (FRA) |
| Olympic Qualifying Event – Oceania | 1 | Billy Ward (AUS) |
| Olympic Qualifying Event – Asia | 1 | Birzhan Zhakypov (KAZ) |
| Olympic Qualifying Event – Europe | 4 | Ferhat Pehlivan (TUR); Aleksandar Aleksandrov (BUL); Paddy Barnes (IRL); Manuel Cappai (ITA) |
| Olympic Qualifying Event – Africa | 6 | Mohamed Flissi (ALG); Abdelali Daraa (MAR); Thomas Essomba (CMR); Juliano Máquina (MOZ); Sulemanu Tetteh (GHA); Ramy Helmy (EGY) |
| Olympic Qualifying Event – America | 3 | Jantony Ortiz (PUR); Carlos Quipo (ECU); Carlos Suárez (TRI) |
| Invitational | 1 | Bayron Molina (HON) |
| Total | 26 | |

=== Flyweight (52 kg) ===
| Competition | Vacancies | Qualified |
|---|---|---|
| WSB Individual Championships | 0 | — |
| 2011 World Championships | 9* | Misha Aloyan (RUS); Andrew Selby (GBR); Rau'shee Warren (USA); Jasurbek Latipov (UZB); Elvin Mamishzade (AZE); Michael Conlan (IRL); Vincenzo Picardi (ITA); Robeisy Ramírez (CUB); Chatchai Butdee (THA) |
| Olympic Qualifying Event – Oceania | 1 | Jackson Woods (AUS) |
| Olympic Qualifying Event – Asia | 4 | Ilyas Suleimenov (KAZ); Nyambayaryn Tögstsogt (MGL); Pak Jong-chol (PRK); Katsuaki Susa (JPN) |
| Olympic Qualifying Event – Europe | 3 | Nordine Oubaali (FRA); Selçuk Eker (TUR); Salomo Ntuve (SWE) |
| Olympic Qualifying Event – Africa | 6 | Oteng Oteng (BOT); Benson Gicharu (KEN); Samir Brahimi (ALG); Duke Micah (GHA); Hesham Yehia (EGY); Oliver Lavigilante (MRI) |
| Olympic Qualifying Event – America | 2 | Jeyvier Cintrón (PUR); Julião Henriques (BRA) |
| Invitational | 1 | Ajmal Faisal (AFG) |
| Total | 26 | |

* Both England and Wales boxers qualified but Andrew Selby beat Khalid Yafai in box-off for Olympic place.

=== Bantamweight (56 kg) ===
| Competition | Vacancies | Qualified |
|---|---|---|
| WSB Individual Championships | 1 | Kanat Abutalipov (KAZ) |
| 2011 World Championships | 10 | Lázaro Álvarez (CUB); Luke Campbell (GBR); Anvar Yunusov (TJK); John Joe Nevin (IRL); Joseph Diaz (USA); Detelin Dalakliev (BUL); Sergey Vodopyanov (RUS); Orzubek Shayimov (UZB); Vittorio Parrinello (ITA); Mohamed Amine Ouadahi (ALG) |
| Olympic Qualifying Event – Oceania | 1 | Ibrahim Balla (AUS) |
| Olympic Qualifying Event – Asia | 3 | Shiva Thapa (IND); Wessam Salamana (SYR); Satoshi Shimizu (JPN) |
| Olympic Qualifying Event – Europe | 4 | Pavlo Ishchenko (UKR); Magomed Abdulhamidov (AZE); Dennis Ceylan (DEN); Merab Turkadze (GEO) |
| Olympic Qualifying Event – Africa | 5 | Aboubakr Lbida (MAR); Isaac Dogboe (GHA); Romeo Lemboumba (GAB); Ayabonga Sonjica (RSA); Jonas Matheus (NAM) |
| Olympic Qualifying Event – America | 4 | Óscar Valdez (MEX); Alberto Melián (ARG); Robenílson Vieira (BRA); William Encarnación (DOM) |
| Invitational | 0 | — |
| Total | 28 | |

=== Lightweight (60 kg) ===
| Competition | Vacancies | Qualified |
|---|---|---|
| WSB Individual Championships | 1 | Rachid Azzedine (FRA)* |
| 2011 World Championships | 10 | Vasyl Lomachenko (UKR); Yasniel Toledo (CUB); Domenico Valentino (ITA); Gani Zhailauov (KAZ); Fazliddin Gaibnazarov (UZB); Han Soon-chul (KOR); Miklós Varga (HUN); Jai Bhagwan (IND); Robson Conceição (BRA); Sailom Adi (THA) |
| Olympic Qualifying Event – Oceania | 1 | Luke Jackson (AUS) |
| Olympic Qualifying Event – Asia | 1 | Liu Qiang (CHN) |
| Olympic Qualifying Event – Europe | 4 | Evaldas Petrauskas (LTU); Vazgen Safaryants (BLR); Fatih Keleş (TUR); Josh Taylor (GBR) |
| Olympic Qualifying Event – Africa | 6 | Ahmed Mejri (TUN); Abdelkader Chadi (ALG); Andrique Allisop (SEY); Abdon Mewoli (CMR); Mohamed Ramadan (EGY); Shafiq Chitou (BEN) |
| Olympic Qualifying Event – America | 4 | Félix Verdejo (PUR); Wellington Arias (DOM); Eduar Marriaga (COL); Jose Ramírez (USA) |
| Invitational | 1 | Juan Huertas (PAN) |
| Total | 28 | |

* Wang Zhimin from China, who won the 2011 WSB Individual Championships at this weight, had his qualification withdrawn by the Chinese NOC. Yerzhan Mussafirov from Kazakhstan, as losing finalist in that competition would have inherited the Olympic berth but was also withdrawn by his NOC. Rachid Azzedine from France inherited the qualification place by virtue of his third-place finish.

=== Light welterweight (64 kg) ===
| Competition | Vacancies | Qualified |
|---|---|---|
| WSB Individual Championships | 0 | — |
| 2011 World Championships | 10 | Éverton Lopes (BRA); Denys Berinchyk (UKR); Vincenzo Mangiacapre (ITA); Tom Stalker (GBR); Gyula Káté (HUN); Heybatulla Hajialiyev (AZE); Uranchimegiin Mönkh-Erdene (MGL); Manoj Kumar (IND); Anthony Yigit (SWE); Jonathan Alonso (ESP) |
| Olympic Qualifying Event – Oceania | 1 | Jeff Horn (AUS) |
| Olympic Qualifying Event – Asia | 4 | Daniyar Yeleussinov (KAZ); Serdar Hudayberdiyev (TKM); Uktamjon Rahmonov (UZB); Mehdi Tolouti (IRI) |
| Olympic Qualifying Event – Europe | 1 | Yakup Şener (TUR) |
| Olympic Qualifying Event – Africa | 6 | Abdelhak Aatkani (MAR); Abderrazak Houya (TUN); Eslam El-Gendy (EGY); Richarno Colin (MRI); Gilbert Choombe (ZAM); Serge Ambomo (CMR) |
| Olympic Qualifying Event – America | 5 | Roniel Iglesias (CUB); Francisco Vargas (PUR); César Villarraga (COL); Jamel Herring (USA); Anderson Rojas (ECU) |
| Invitational | 1 | Zdeněk Chládek (CZE) |
| Total | 28 | |

=== Welterweight (69 kg) ===
| Competition | Vacancies | Qualified |
|---|---|---|
| WSB Individual Championships | 0 | — |
| 2011 World Championships | 10 | Taras Shelestyuk (UKR); Serik Sapiyev (KAZ); Vikas Krishan Yadav (IND); Egidijus Kavaliauskas (LTU); Andrey Zamkovoy (RUS); Errol Spence (USA); Vasile Belous (MDA); Fred Evans (GBR); Alexis Vastine (FRA); Yasuhiro Suzuki (JPN) |
| Olympic Qualifying Event – Oceania | 1 | Cameron Hammond (AUS) |
| Olympic Qualifying Event – Asia | 3 | Maimaitituersun Qiong (CHN); Byambyn Tüvshinbat (MGL); Amin Ghasemipour (IRI) |
| Olympic Qualifying Event – Europe | 2 | Adam Nolan (IRL); Patrick Wojcicki (GER) |
| Olympic Qualifying Event – Africa | 6 | Mehdi Khalsi (MAR); Ilyas Abbadi (ALG); Siphiwe Lusizi (RSA); Seleman Kidunda (TAN); Yannick Mitoumba (GAB); Moustapha Hima (NIG) |
| Olympic Qualifying Event – America | 5 | Myke Carvalho (BRA); Óscar Molina (MEX); Carlos Sánchez (ECU); Gabriel Maestre (VEN); Custio Clayton (CAN) |
| Invitational | 1 | Ahmed Abdul-Karim (IRQ) |
| Total | 28 | |

=== Middleweight (75 kg) ===
| Competition | Vacancies | Qualified |
|---|---|---|
| WSB Individual Championships | 1 | Soltan Migitinov (AZE)* |
| 2011 World Championships | 10 | Evhen Khytrov (UKR); Ryota Murata (JPN); Bogdan Juratoni (ROU); Esquiva Falcão (BRA); Aleksandar Drenovak (SRB); Darren O'Neill (IRL); Andranik Hakobyan (ARM); Danabek Suzhanov (KAZ); Zoltán Harcsa (HUN); Stefan Härtel (GER) |
| Olympic Qualifying Event – Oceania | 1 | Jesse Ross (AUS) |
| Olympic Qualifying Event – Asia | 4 | Abbos Atoev (UZB); Nursahat Pazziyev (TKM); Sobirjon Nazarov (TJK); Vijender Singh (IND) |
| Olympic Qualifying Event – Europe | 2 | Adem Kılıççı (TUR); Anthony Ogogo (GBR) |
| Olympic Qualifying Event – Africa | 5 | Badreddine Haddioui (MAR); Mujandjae Kasuto (NAM); Muideen Akanji (NGR); Abdelmalek Rahou (ALG); Mohamed Hikal (EGY) |
| Olympic Qualifying Event – America | 5 | Terrell Gausha (USA); Junior Castillo (DOM); Marlo Delgado (ECU); José Espinoza (VEN); Enrique Collazo (PUR) |
| Invitational | 0 | — |
| Total | 28 | |

* Sergiy Derevyanchenko from Ukraine, who won the 2011 WSB Individual Championships at this weight, had his qualification withdrawn by the Ukrainian NOC. Soltan Migitinov from Azerbaijan inherited the qualification place by virtue of his second-place finish.

=== Light heavyweight (81 kg) ===
| Competition | Vacancies | Qualified |
|---|---|---|
| WSB Individual Championships | 1 | Abdelhafid Benchabla (ALG) |
| 2011 World Championships | 10 | Julio César la Cruz (CUB); Adilbek Niyazymbetov (KAZ); Egor Mekhontsev (RUS); Elshod Rasulov (UZB); Damien Hooper (AUS); Meng Fanlong (CHN); Oleksandr Hvozdyk (UKR); Ehsan Rouzbahani (IRI); Enrico Kölling (GER); Jeysson Monroy (COL) |
| Olympic Qualifying Event – Oceania | 0 | — |
| Olympic Qualifying Event – Asia | 3 | Sumit Sangwan (IND); Jahon Qurbonov (TJK); Ihab Al-Matbouli (JOR) |
| Olympic Qualifying Event – Europe | 3 | Bahram Muzaffer (TUR); Vatan Huseynli (AZE); Mikhail Dauhaliavets (BLR) |
| Olympic Qualifying Event – Africa | 4 | Yahia El-Mekachari (TUN); Ahmed Barki (MAR); Christian Donfack (CMR); Lukman Lawal (NGR) |
| Olympic Qualifying Event – America | 4 | Marcus Browne (USA); Yamaguchi Falcão (BRA); Carlos Góngora (ECU); Osmar Bravo (NCA) |
| Invitational | 1 | Boško Drašković (MNE) |
| Total | 26 | |

=== Heavyweight (91 kg) ===
| Competition | Vacancies | Qualified |
|---|---|---|
| WSB Individual Championships | 1 | Clemente Russo (ITA) |
| 2011 World Championships | 6 | Oleksandr Usyk (UKR); Teymur Mammadov (AZE); Siarhei Karneyeu (BLR); Wang Xuanxuan (CHN); Artur Beterbiyev (RUS); José Larduet (CUB) |
| Olympic Qualifying Event – Oceania | 1 | Jai Opetaia (AUS) |
| Olympic Qualifying Event – Asia | 1 | Ali Mazaheri (IRI) |
| Olympic Qualifying Event – Europe | 1 | Tervel Pulev (BUL) |
| Olympic Qualifying Event – Africa | 2 | Chouaib Bouloudinats (ALG); ~~Maxwell Amponsah (GHA)~~ |
| Olympic Qualifying Event – America | 3 | Michael Hunter (USA); Yamil Peralta (ARG); Julio Castillo (ECU) |
| Invitational | 1 | Tumba Silva (ANG) |
| Total | 16 | |

=== Super heavyweight (+91 kg) ===
| Competition | Vacancies | Qualified |
|---|---|---|
| WSB Individual Championships | 0 | — |
| 2011 World Championships | 6 | Magomedrasul Majidov (AZE); Anthony Joshua (GBR); Ivan Dychko (KAZ); Erik Pfeifer (GER); Erislandy Savón (CUB); Roberto Cammarelle (ITA) |
| Olympic Qualifying Event – Oceania | 1 | Johan Linde (AUS) |
| Olympic Qualifying Event – Asia | 1 | Zhang Zhilei (CHN) |
| Olympic Qualifying Event – Europe | 2 | Magomed Omarov (RUS); Tony Yoka (FRA) |
| Olympic Qualifying Event – Africa | 2 | Mohamed Arjaoui (MAR); Blaise Yepmou (CMR) |
| Olympic Qualifying Event – America | 3 | Ítalo Perea (ECU); Dominic Breazeale (USA); Simon Kean (CAN) |
| Invitational | 1 | Meji Mwamba (COD) |
| Total | 16 | |

== Women's events ==
Olympic Qualification System per Continent and by Weight Category.

| Weight | Africa | America | Asia | Europe | Oceania | Total |
|---|---|---|---|---|---|---|
| 51 kg | 1 | 2 (1) | 2 (1) | 3 (1) | 1 | 12 |
| 60 kg | 1 (1) | 1 (1) | 2 (1) | 3 (1) | 1 | 12 |
| 75 kg | 1 (1) | 2 (1) | 1 (1) | 3 (1) | 1 | 12 |
| Total | 5 | 8 | 8 | 12 | 3 | 36 |

- ( ) Tripartite Selection Quota

=== Flyweight (51 kg) ===
| Competition | Vacancies | Qualified |
|---|---|---|
| 2012 World Championships | 9 | Ren Cancan (CHN); Nicola Adams (GBR); Karolina Michalczuk (POL); Elena Savelyeva (RUS); Marlen Esparza (USA); Mary Kom (IND); Karlha Magliocco (VEN); Maroua Rahali (TUN); Siona Fernandes (NZL) |
| Invitational | 3 | Stoyka Petrova (BUL); Kim Hye-song (PRK); Érica Matos (BRA) |
| Total | 12 | |

=== Lightweight (60 kg) ===
| Competition | Vacancies | Qualified |
|---|---|---|
| 2012 World Championships | 8 | Katie Taylor (IRL); Sofya Ochigava (RUS); Mavzuna Chorieva (TJK); Natasha Jonas (GBR); Adriana Araújo (BRA); Saida Khassenova (KAZ); Rim Jouini (TUN); Alexis Pritchard (NZL) |
| Invitational | 4 | Mihaela Lăcătuș (ROU); Dong Cheng (CHN); Quanitta Underwood (USA); Mahjouba Oubtil (MAR) |
| Total | 12 | |

=== Middleweight (75 kg) ===
| Competition | Vacancies | Qualified |
|---|---|---|
| 2012 World Championships | 8 | Savannah Marshall (GBR); Elena Vystropova (AZE); Nadezhda Torlopova (RUS); Li Jinzi (CHN); Naomi Fischer-Rasmussen (AUS); Claressa Shields (USA); Roseli Feitosa (BRA); Edith Ogoke (NGR) |
| Invitational | 4 | Anna Laurell (SWE); Marina Volnova (KAZ); Mary Spencer (CAN); Elizabeth Andiego (KEN) |
| Total | 12 | |
