= Boxing at the 2011 Pan American Games – Qualification =

== Qualification timeline ==
| Event | Date | Venue |
|---|---|---|
| Pan American Games Qualifier 1 | March 25 to March 30, 2011 | (Venezuela) Cumaná |
| Pan American Games Qualifier 2 | April 30 to May 6, 2011 | (Ecuador) Quito |
| Pan American Games Qualifier 3 | July 3 to July 7, 2011 | Panama City^{1} |

1. Colombia was scheduled to host the third qualification tournament but had to withdraw when the money budgeted for the event had to be reassigned to flood relief. On May 15, Panama was confirmed to host the tournament. Earlier Dominican Republic and the Bahamas had put in bids.

== Qualification summary ==
| NOC | Men | | | | | | | | | | Women | | | Total |
| NOC | -49kg | -52kg | -56kg | -60kg | -64kg | -69kg | -75kg | -81kg | -91kg | +91kg | -51kg | -60kg | -75kg | Total |
|---|---|---|---|---|---|---|---|---|---|---|---|---|---|---|
| Argentina | X | | X | | X | X | | | X | | X | X | | 7 |
| Bahamas | | | | | X | | | | | | | | | 1 |
| Barbados | | | | X | | | | | X | | | | | 2 |
| Brazil | | X | X | X | X | X | X | X | | | | X | X | 9 |
| Canada | | | X | | | X | X | | X | | X | X | X | 7 |
| Chile | | | | | | X | | | | | | | | 1 |
| Colombia | X | X | X | X | | | | X | X | X | X | X | | 9 |
| Costa Rica | X | | | | | | | | | | X | | | 2 |
| Cuba | X | X | X | X | X | X | X | X | X | X | | | | 10 |
| Dominica | | | | | | | X | | | | | | | 1 |
| Dominican Republic | X | X | X | X | X | X | X | X | X | X | | | X | 11 |
| Ecuador | X | X | X | X | X | X | X | X | X | X | | | | 10 |
| El Salvador | | X | | | | | X | | | | | | | 2 |
| Guatemala | | X | | | X | | | | | | | | | 2 |
| Jamaica | | | | | | | X | | | | | | | 1 |
| Mexico | X | X | X | X | X | X | X | X | X | X | X | X | X | 13 |
| Nicaragua | | X | | X | X | | | | | | | | X | 4 |
| Panama | X | | | | X | | | | | | | | | 2 |
| Peru | | | | | | X | | | | | | | | 1 |
| Puerto Rico | X | | X | X | X | X | | X | | X | | X | | 9 |
| Trinidad and Tobago | | | | | | | X | | | | | | | 1 |
| United States | | X | | X | | X | X | X | | X | X | X | X | 9 |
| Venezuela | X | | X | X | X | X | X | | X | X | X | | | 9 |
| Virgin Islands | | | | | | | | | | X | | | X | 2 |
| Total: 24 NOCs | 10 | 10 | 10 | 11 | 12 | 12 | 12 | 8 | 9 | 9 | 7 | 7 | 7 | 124 |

== Light flyweight (-49kg) ==
| Event | Vacancies | Qualified |
|---|---|---|
| Host | 1 | (Mexico) Joselito Velázquez |
| Pan American Games Qualifier 1 | 4 | (Dominican Republic) Juan Medina (Puerto Rico) Anthony Ortiz (Colombia) Ceiber Avila (Argentina) Junior Zarate |
| Pan American Games Qualifier 2 | 3 | (Ecuador) Carlos Quipo (Cuba) Yosvany Veitia (Costa Rica) David Jimenez |
| Pan American Games Qualifier 3 | 2 | (Panama) Gilberto Pedroza (Venezuela) Evier Hernandez |
| TOTAL | 10 | |

== Flyweight (-52kg) ==
| Event | Vacancies | Qualified |
|---|---|---|
| Host | 1 | (Mexico) Elías Emigdio |
| Pan American Games Qualifier 1 | 4 | (Dominican Republic) Dagoberto Agüero (Cuba) Robeisy Ramírez (Guatemala) Eddy Valenzuela (Colombia) Oscar Negrete |
| Pan American Games Qualifier 2 | 3 | (Brazil) Julião Neto (Ecuador) José Meza (Nicaragua) Marvin Solano |
| Pan American Games Qualifier 3 | 1 | (Puerto Rico) ~~Carlos Ortiz~~ (United States) John Franklin |
| Wildcard | 1 | (El Salvador) Jhon Corona |
| TOTAL | 10 | |

1. Ortiz failed a drug test and will not compete at the games.

== Bantamweight (-56kg) ==
| Event | Vacancies | Qualified |
|---|---|---|
| Host | 1 | (Mexico) Óscar Valdez |
| Pan American Games Qualifier 1 | 4 | (Cuba) Lázaro Álvarez (Puerto Rico) Félix Verdejo (Ecuador) Luis Porozo (Dominican Republic) Luis Salazar |
| Pan American Games Qualifier 2 | 3 | (Brazil) Robenilson DeJesus (Colombia) Deivi Julio (Argentina) Alberto Melián |
| Pan American Games Qualifier 3 | 2 | (Venezuela) Ángel Rodríguez (Canada) Joey Laviolette |
| TOTAL | 10 | |

== Lightweight (-60kg) ==
| Event | Vacancies | Qualified |
|---|---|---|
| Host | 1 | (Mexico) Angel Jordan |
| Pan American Games Qualifier 1 | 4 | (Cuba) Yasniel Toledo Lopez (Venezuela) Fradimil Macayo (Puerto Rico) Angel Suarez (Nicaragua) Julio Laguna |
| Pan American Games Qualifier 2 | 3 | (Brazil) Robson Conceição (Colombia) César Villarraga (Ecuador) Julio Cortez |
| Pan American Games Qualifier 3 | 3 | (Dominican Republic) Wellington Arias (Barbados) Cobia Breedy (United States) Toka Kahn-Clary |
| TOTAL | 11 | |

== Light welterweight (-64kg) ==
| Event | Vacancies | Qualified |
|---|---|---|
| Host | 1 | (Mexico) Juan Pablo Romero |
| Pan American Games Qualifier 1 | 4 | (Cuba) Roniel Iglesias (Brazil) Éverton Lopes (Guatemala) Jose Virula Lopez (Dominican Republic) Ricardo Garcia |
| Pan American Games Qualifier 2 | 3 | (Argentina) Fabián Maidana (Puerto Rico) Antonio Ortiz (Ecuador) Anderson Rojas |
| Pan American Games Qualifier 3 | 4 | (Venezuela) Joelvis Hernandes (Panama) Cesar Rivas (Nicaragua) Luis Amador (The Bahamas) Valentino Knowles |
| TOTAL | 12 | |

== Welterweight (-69kg) ==
| Event | Vacancies | Qualified |
|---|---|---|
| Host | 1 | (Mexico) Óscar Molina |
| Pan American Games Qualifier 1 | 4 | (Venezuela) Gabriel Maestre (Ecuador) Carlos Sanchez (Chile) Patricio Villagra (United States) Errol Spence |
| Pan American Games Qualifier 2 | 3 | (Brazil) Myke Carvalho (Dominican Republic) Raul Sanchez (Cuba) Carlos Banteur |
| Pan American Games Qualifier 3 | 4 | (Peru) Luis Miranda (Argentina) Alberto Palmeta (Puerto Rico) Emmanuel de Jesus (Canada) Mian Hussain |
| TOTAL | 12 | |

== Middleweight (-75kg) ==
| Event | Vacancies | Qualified |
|---|---|---|
| Host | 1 | (Mexico) Juan Mercado |
| Pan American Games Qualifier 1 | 3 | (Cuba) Emilio Correa (Venezuela) Juan Carlos Rodríguez (Colombia) ~~Alex Theran~~ (Ecuador) Jaime Cortez |
| Pan American Games Qualifier 2 | 3 | (Canada) Brody Blair (Brazil) David DaCosta (El Salvador) Mario Bernal |
| Pan American Games Qualifier 3 | 4 | (Dominican Republic) Junior Castillo (United States) Damarias Russell (Jamaica) Reece Shagourie (Trinidad and Tobago) Andrew Fermin |
| Wildcard | 1 | (Dominica) Rowain Christopher |
| TOTAL | 12 | |

== Light heavyweight (-81kg) ==
| Event | Vacancies | Qualified |
|---|---|---|
| Host | 1 | (Mexico) Armando Piña |
| Pan American Games Qualifier 1 | 3 | (Cuba) Julio César La Cruz (Ecuador) Carlos Góngora (Brazil) Yamaguchi Falcao |
| Pan American Games Qualifier 2 | 3 | (Dominican Republic) Félix Valera (United States) Jeffrey Spencer (Colombia) Jeison Monroy |
| Pan American Games Qualifier 3 | 2 | (Puerto Rico) José Soto (Jamaica) ~~Jovan Young~~ |
| TOTAL | 8 | |

== Heavyweight (-91kg) ==
| Event | Vacancies | Qualified |
|---|---|---|
| Host | 1 | (Mexico) Mario Heredia |
| Pan American Games Qualifier 1 | 3 | (Cuba) Luis Eunice Pero (Ecuador) Julio Castillo (Canada) Steven Harvey |
| Pan American Games Qualifier 2 | 3 | (Colombia) Deivis Julio (Argentina) Yamil Peralta (Venezuela) Gualfredo Rivero |
| Pan American Games Qualifier 3 | 2 | (Barbados) Anderson Emanuel (Dominican Republic) Manuel Mariñez |
| TOTAL | 9 | |

== Super heavyweight (+91kg) ==
| Event | Vacancies | Qualified |
|---|---|---|
| Host | 1 | (Mexico) Juan Hiracheta |
| Pan American Games Qualifier 1 | 3 | (Cuba) Erislandy Savón (Dominican Republic) Cristian Cabrera (United States) Danny Kelly |
| Pan American Games Qualifier 2 | 3 | (Venezuela) José Payares (Ecuador) Ítalo Perea (Puerto Rico) Gerardo Bisbal |
| Pan American Games Qualifier 3 | 2 | (Colombia) Isaias Mena (United States Virgin Islands) Laurent Clayton |
| TOTAL | 9 | |

== Women's flyweight (51kg) ==
| Event | Vacancies | Qualified |
|---|---|---|
| Host | 1 | (Mexico) Silvia Torres |
| Pan American Games Qualifier 1 | 2 | (Argentina) Paola Benavides (Venezuela) Karla Magliocco |
| Pan American Games Qualifier 2 | 2 | (Canada) Mandy Bujold (United States) Christina Cruz^{1} |
| Pan American Games Qualifier 3 | 2 | (Colombia) Ingrit Valencia (Costa Rica) Pamela Sanchez Valdivia |
| TOTAL | 7 | |

1. Jemyma Betrian of the Netherlands Antilles was disqualified because she had worked as a professional Muay Thai fighter.

== Women's light welterweight (60kg) ==
| Event | Vacancies | Qualified |
|---|---|---|
| Host | 1 | (Mexico) Erika Cruz |
| Pan American Games Qualifier 1 | 2 | (Brazil) Adriana Araujo (Puerto Rico) Kiria Tapia |
| Pan American Games Qualifier 2 | 2 | (Canada) Sandra Bizier (United States) Quanitta Underwood |
| Pan American Games Qualifier 3 | 2 | (Argentina) Celeste Peralta (Colombia) Jenifer Caceres |
| TOTAL | 7 | |

== Women's light heavyweight (75kg) ==
| Event | Vacancies | Qualified |
|---|---|---|
| Host | 1 | (Mexico) Alma Ibarra |
| Pan American Games Qualifier 1 | 2 | (Brazil) Roselli Feitosa (Canada) Mary Spencer |
| Pan American Games Qualifier 2 | 2 | (Dominican Republic) Yenebier Guillén (United States) Franchon Crews |
| Pan American Games Qualifier 3 | 2 | (United States Virgin Islands) Tiffany Reddick (Nicaragua) Ledy Mayorga |
| TOTAL | 7 | |
