= 2012 American Boxing Olympic Qualification Tournament =

The 2012 American Boxing Olympic Qualification Tournament was held in Rio de Janeiro, Brazil from May 5 to May 12 to determination qualification spots for Boxing at the 2012 Summer Olympics.

== Qualified athletes ==
Weight	1st	2nd	3rd	4th	5th
Light flyweight (49kg)	Jantony Ortiz (PUR)	Carlos Quipo (ECU)	Carlos Suárez (TRI)		
Flyweight (52kg)	Jeyvier Cintrón (PUR)	Julião Henriques (BRA)			
Bantamweight (56kg)	Óscar Valdez (MEX)	Alberto Melián (ARG)	Robenílson de Jesus (BRA)	William Encarnación (DOM)	
Lightweight (60kg)	Félix Verdejo (PUR)	Wellington Arias (DOM)	Eduar Marriaga (COL)	Jose Ramírez (USA)	
Light welterweight (64kg)	Roniel Iglesias (CUB)	Francisco Vargas (PUR)	César Villarraga (COL)	Jamel Herring (USA)	Anderson Rojas (ECU)
Welterweight (69kg)	Myke Carvalho (BRA)	Óscar Molina (MEX)	Carlos Sánchez (ECU)	Gabriel Maestre (VEN)	Custio Clayton (CAN)
Middleweight (75kg)	Terrell Gausha (USA)	Junior Castillo (DOM)	Marlo Delgado (ECU)	José Espinoza (VEN)	Enrique Collazo (PUR)
Light heavyweight (81kg)	Marcus Browne (USA)	Yamaguchi Falcão (BRA)	Carlos Góngora (ECU)	Osmar Bravo (NCA)	
Heavyweight (91kg)	Michael Hunter (USA)	Yamil Peralta (ARG)	Julio Castillo (ECU)		
Super heavyweight (+91kg)	Ítalo Perea (ECU)	Dominic Breazeale (USA)	Simon Kean (CAN)		

== Qualification summary ==
NOTE: This chart only lists slots qualified by way of the 2012 American Boxing Olympic Qualification Tournament and does not include slots obtains by NOCs by other means, such as though the 2011 World Amateur Boxing Championships.

NOC	49	52	56	60	64	69	75	81	91	+91	Total
Argentina			X						X		2
Brazil		X	X			X		X			4
Canada						X				X	2
Cuba					X						1
Colombia				X	X						2
Dominican Republic			X	X			X				3
Ecuador	X				X	X	X	X	X	X	7
Mexico			X			X					2
Nicaragua								X			1
Puerto Rico	X	X		X	X		X				5
Trinidad and Tobago	X										1
United States				X	X		X	X	X	X	6
Venezuela						X	X				2
Total: 13 NOCs	3	2	4	4	5	5	5	4	3	3	38

== Results ==
=== Light flyweight ===
Round of 32 – May 5
	Score	
Ricardo Blackman (BAR)	11–13	Emilien Boucher (CAN)

Round of 16; May 6
Jantony Ortiz (PUR)	15
Santos Vasquez (USA)	8
Eduard Bermúdez (VEN)	19
Álvaro Vargas (GUA)	7
David Jiménez (CRC)	14
Carlos Suárez (TRI)	+14
Enoc Hualinga (PER)	15
Gilberto Pedroza (PAN)	7
Carlos Quipo (ECU)	21
Paulo Carvalho (BRA)	18
Junior Zárate (ARG)	7
Céiber Ávila (COL)	13
Juan Medina (DOM)	DSQ
Joselito Velázquez (MEX)
Bayron Molina (HON)	10
Emilien Boucher (CAN)	25

Quarterfinals; May 8
Jantony Ortiz (PUR)	12
Eduard Bermúdez (VEN)	9
Carlos Suárez (TRI)	11
Enoc Hualinga (PER)	7
Carlos Quipo (ECU)	24
Céiber Ávila (COL)	15
Joselito Velázquez (MEX)	22
Emilien Boucher (CAN)	7

Semifinals; May 11
Jantony Ortiz (PUR)	23
Carlos Suárez (TRI)	4
Carlos Quipo (ECU)	20
Joselito Velázquez (MEX)	16

Final; May 12
Jantony Ortiz (PUR)	10
Carlos Quipo (ECU)	8

=== Flyweight ===
Round of 16; May 7
Johan Vargas (COL)	8
Julião Henriques (BRA)	17
Lawrence Singh (TRI)	6
Braulio Ávila (MEX)	21
Dante Colque (BOL)	6
Eddie Valenzuela (GUA)	18
Kenny Lally (CAN)	WO
Rubén Casero (URU)
Amrit Herrera (PAN)	5
Jeyvier Cintrón (PUR)	17

Quarterfinals; May 9
Dagoberto Agüero (DOM)	9
José Luis Meza (ECU)	14
Jefferson Pérez (VEN)	9
Julião Henriques (BRA)	17
Braulio Ávila (MEX)	10
Eddie Valenzuela (GUA)	15
Kenny Lally (CAN)	7
Jeyvier Cintrón (PUR)	16

Semifinals; May 11
José Luis Meza (ECU)	10
Julião Henriques (BRA)	14
Eddie Valenzuela (GUA)	6
Jeyvier Cintrón (PUR)	12

Final; May 12
Julião Henriques (BRA)	10
Jeyvier Cintrón (PUR)	19

=== Bantamweight ===
Round of 32 – May 5
	Score	
José Díaz (VEN)	8–18	Óscar Valdez (MEX)
Oscar Negrete (COL)	15–4	Sergio Zapata (BOL)

Round of 16; May 6
William Encarnación (DOM)	12
Eduardo Estela (URU)	9
Jaime Arboleda (PAN)	19
Anibal Murillo (PER)	18
Justin Hocko (CAN)	12
Alberto Machado (PUR)	16
Imran Khan (GUY)	5
Alberto Melián (ARG)	20
Alexander Espinoza (NCA)	13
Joselito Aguirre (GUA)	17
Shakir Garcia (TRI)	1
Robenílson de Jesus (BRA)	13
Julio Cortez (ECU)	WO
Tafari Ebanks (CAY)
Óscar Valdez (MEX)	15
Oscar Negrete (COL)	9

Quarterfinals; May 8
William Encarnación (DOM)	26
Jaime Arboleda (PAN)	7
Alberto Machado (PUR)	8
Alberto Melián (ARG)	17
Joselito Aguirre (GUA)	7
Robenílson de Jesus (BRA)	19
Julio Cortez (ECU)	9
Óscar Valdez (MEX)	23

Semifinals; May 11
William Encarnación (DOM)	8
Alberto Melián (ARG)	16
Robenílson de Jesus (BRA)	8
Óscar Valdez (MEX)	9

Final; May 12
Alberto Melián (ARG)	11
Óscar Valdez (MEX)	29

=== Lightweight ===
Round of 32 – May 5
	Score	
Juan Huertas (PAN)	21–5	Stephen Saint-Sauveur (HAI)
Juan Reyes (GUA)	28–8	Jonny Baccino (URU)
Isaac Gutiérrez (CHI)	3–14	Félix Verdejo (PUR)

Round of 16; May 7
Héctor Manzanilla (VEN)	9
Wellington Arias (DOM)	16
Luis Enrique Porozo (ECU)	18
Tyson Martínez (PER)	9
Michael Alexander (TRI)
Jose Ramírez (USA)	RSC
Alex Rynn (CAN)	25
Cobia Breedy (BAR)	9
Eduard Marriaga (COL)	19
Elías Roca (BOL)	6
Teofilo Jeronimo (HON)	7
Stefan Gouveia (GUY)	16
Ángel Gutiérrez (MEX)	14
Juan Huertas (PAN)	8
Juan Reyes (GUA)	7
Félix Verdejo (PUR)	14

Quarterfinals; May 9
Wellington Arias (DOM)	9
Luis Enrique Porozo (ECU)	3
Jose Ramírez (USA)	23
Alex Rynn (CAN)	11
Eduard Marriaga (COL)	25
Stefan Gouveia (GUY)	9
Ángel Gutiérrez (MEX)	8
Félix Verdejo (PUR)	17

Semifinals; May 11
Wellington Arias (DOM)	13
Jose Ramírez (USA)	10
Eduard Marriaga (COL)	7
Félix Verdejo (PUR)	21

Final; May 12
Wellington Arias (DOM)	7
Félix Verdejo (PUR)	13

=== Light welterweight ===
Round of 32 – May 5
	Score	
César Díaz (PER)	15–12	Francisco Tejada (ESA)
Lyndel Marcellin (LCA)	RSC	Bert Braithwaite (GUY)
Kendall Ebanks (CAY)	WO	Lester Martínez (GUA)
Juan Pablo Loayza (BOL)	RSC	Jamel Herring (USA)
César Rivas (PAN)	5–15	Yoelvys Hernández (VEN)
Julio Laguna (NCA)	RSCI	Daniel Muñoz (CHI)

Round of 16; May 6
César Villarraga (COL)	14
Ricardo García (DOM)	5
Yves Ulysse Jr. (CAN)	14
Lexton Bates (TRI)	10
Alberto Palmetta (ARG)	9
Roniel Iglesias (CUB)	13
Ánderson Rojas (ECU)	13
Valentino Knowles (BAH)	9
Francisco Vargas (PUR)	+11
Juan Pablo Romero (MEX)	11
César Díaz (PER)	16
Lyndel Marcellin (LCA)	7
Lester Martínez (GUA)	9
Jamel Herring (USA)	15
Yoelvys Hernández (VEN)	17
Julio Laguna (NCA)	8

Quarterfinals; May 8
César Villarraga (COL)	12
Yves Ulysse Jr. (CAN)	9
Roniel Iglesias (CUB)	18
Ánderson Rojas (ECU)	6
Francisco Vargas (PUR)	17
César Díaz (PER)	7
Jamel Herring (USA)	10
Yoelvys Hernández (VEN)	8

Semifinals; May 11
César Villarraga (COL)	7
Roniel Iglesias (CUB)	14
Francisco Vargas (PUR)	11
Jamel Herring (USA)	6

Final; May 12
Roniel Iglesias (CUB)	12
Francisco Vargas (PUR)	7

=== Welterweight ===
Round of 32 – May 5
	Score	
Jorge Vivas (COL)	10–20	Custio Clayton (CAN)
Roberto Arriaza (NCA)	9–16	Arturo Izquierdo (CRC)
Arisnoidys Despaigne (CUB)	14–4	Aaron Prince (TRI)
Raúl Sánchez (DOM)	9–17	Myke Carvalho (BRA)

Round of 16; May 7
Nathan Ridings (ESA)
Óscar Molina (MEX)	RSC
Brian Castaño (ARG)	RSC
Keithland King (VIN)
Prichard Colón (PUR)	14
Leviticus Hield (BAH)	7
Gabriel Maestre (VEN)	RSC
Lucien Hewlette (DMA)
Fernando Martínez (URU)	4
Luis Miranda (PER)	8
John Rentería (PAN)	7
Carlos Sánchez (ECU)	19
Custio Clayton (CAN)	21
Arturo Izquierdo (CRC)	5
Arisnoidys Despaigne (CUB)	9
Myke Carvalho (BRA)	17

Quarterfinals; May 9
Óscar Molina (MEX)	25
Brian Castaño (ARG)	14
Prichard Colón (PUR)	8
Gabriel Maestre (VEN)	13
Luis Miranda (PER)	11
Carlos Sánchez (ECU)	15
Custio Clayton (CAN)	9
Myke Carvalho (BRA)	12

Semifinals; May 11
Óscar Molina (MEX)	12
Gabriel Maestre (VEN)	9
Carlos Sánchez (ECU)	4
Myke Carvalho (BRA)	12

Final; May 12
Óscar Molina (MEX)	10
Myke Carvalho (BRA)	15

=== Middleweight ===
Round of 32 – May 5
	Score	
Brody Blair (CAN)	21–9	Fabián Guedes (URU)
Emilio Correa (CUB)	16–5	Leonar Carrillo (COL)
Junior Castillo (DOM)	19–6	Joseph Cherkashyn (CHI)

Round of 16; May 7
Alan Castaño (ARG)	10
Marlo Delgado (ECU)	17
Marcos Méndez (MEX)	11
Damian Davidson (ANT)	5
Oliver Ballesteros (NCA)	5
Terrell Gausha (USA)	22
Enrique Collazo (PUR)	15
Jermaine Burnett (JAM)	9
Andrew Fermin (TRI)	9
Rowain Christopher (DMA)	0
Stan Stanisclasse (HAI)
José Espinoza (VEN)	RSC
Miguel Ugarte (BOL)	6
Brody Blair (CAN)	34
Emilio Correa (CUB)	DSQ
Junior Castillo (DOM)

Quarterfinals; May 9
Marlo Delgado (ECU)	14
Marcos Méndez (MEX)	11
Terrell Gausha (USA)	16
Enrique Collazo (PUR)	5
Andrew Fermin (TRI)	11
José Espinoza (VEN)	16
Brody Blair (CAN)	15
Junior Castillo (DOM)	20

Semifinals; May 11
Marlo Delgado (ECU)	10
Terrell Gausha (USA)	15
José Espinoza (VEN)
Junior Castillo (DOM)	RSCI

Final; May 12
Terrell Gausha (USA)	6
Junior Castillo (DOM)	2

=== Light heavyweight ===
Round of 32 – May 5
	Score	
Dariel Ebanks (CAY)	+12–12	Ezequiel Basualdo (ARG)

Round of 16; May 6
Augustin Jean-Pierre (HAI)	5
Janathan Hanson (JAM)	11
Miguel Larrosa (URU)	9
Osmar Bravo (NCA)	17
Jonathan Savard (CAN)	17
César Leturia (PER)	8
Yamaguchi Falcão (BRA)	17
Francisco Ortega (MEX)	9
Leonardo Caveneiro (VEN)	5
Carlos Góngora (ECU)	13
Joel Kirby (ANT)	8
Lenon Bannis (DMA)	9
Declan Calliste (TRI)
Marcus Browne (USA)	RSCH
Félix Valera (DOM)	15
Dariel Ebanks (CAY)	9

Quarterfinals; May 8
Janathan Hanson (JAM)	2
Osmar Bravo (NCA)	9
Jonathan Savard (CAN)	8
Yamaguchi Falcão (BRA)	17
Carlos Góngora (ECU)	WO
Lenon Bannis (DMA)
Marcus Browne (USA)	12
Félix Valera (DOM)	6

Semifinals; May 11
Osmar Bravo (NCA)	9
Yamaguchi Falcão (BRA)	18
Carlos Góngora (ECU)	8
Marcus Browne (USA)	12

Final; May 12
Yamaguchi Falcão (BRA)	6
Marcus Browne (USA)	14

=== Heavyweight ===
Round of 16; May 5
Deivi Julio (COL)	11
Anderson Emmanuel (BAR)	5
José García (MEX)	4
Yamil Peralta (ARG)	20
Edgar Muñoz (VEN)	KO
Devon Jones (TRI)
Ryan Charles (LCA)	5
Michael Hunter (USA)	14
John Darren (GRN)
Marcio Figueroa (NCA)	RSC
José Santiago (PUR)	12
Élber Santos (BRA)	16
Julio Castillo (ECU)	12
Cristian Cabrera (DOM)	3

Quarterfinals; May 8
Samir El Mais (CAN)	16
Deivi Julio (COL)	11
Yamil Peralta (ARG)	15
Edgar Muñoz (VEN)	7
Michael Hunter (USA)	25
Marcio Figueroa (NCA)	7
Élber Santos (BRA)	4
Julio Castillo (ECU)	13

Semifinals; May 11
Samir El Mais (CAN)	12
Yamil Peralta (ARG)	15
Michael Hunter (USA)	14
Julio Castillo (ECU)	8

Final; May 12
Yamil Peralta (ARG)	10
Michael Hunter (USA)	12

=== Super heavyweight ===
Round of 16; May 7
Damian Sealy (BAR)
Benjey Zimmerman (IOA)	KO
Isaías Mena (COL)	15
Gerardo Bisbal (PUR)	+15
Clayton Laurent (ISV)	11
Gidelson Silva (BRA)	16
José Payares (VEN)	10
Dominic Breazeale (USA)	12

Quarterfinals; May 9
Simon Kean (CAN)	RSC
Christopher Joseph (DMA)
Leonardo Taborda (ARG)	9
Ítalo Perea (ECU)	12
Benjey Zimmerman (IOA)	8
Gerardo Bisbal (PUR)	13
Gidelson Silva (BRA)	12
Dominic Breazeale (USA)	18

Semifinals; May 11
Simon Kean (CAN)
Ítalo Perea (ECU)	KO
Gerardo Bisbal (PUR)	12
Dominic Breazeale (USA)	15

Final; May 12
Ítalo Perea (ECU)	14
Dominic Breazeale (USA)	10

== See also ==
- Boxing at the 2012 Summer Olympics – Qualification
