= Boxing at the 2013 Bolivarian Games =

Boxing competitions

Boxing, for the 2013 Bolivarian Games, took place from 24 November to 29 November 2013.

== Medal table ==
Key:

* Host nation (Peru)

Rank	Nation	Gold	Silver	Bronze	Total
1	Venezuela (VEN)	4	1	4	9
2	Colombia (COL)	3	5	3	11
3	Dominican Republic (DOM)	3	2	2	7
4	Ecuador (ECU)	2	3	4	9
5	Panama (PAN)	1	0	3	4
6	Peru (PER)*	0	1	3	4
7	Chile (CHI)	0	1	2	3
8	Bolivia (BOL)	0	0	5	5
Totals (8 entries)		13	13	26	52

== Medal summary ==
=== Men's events ===
Event	Gold	Silver	Bronze
Light flyweight (~49 kg)	Yuberjen Martínez (COL)	Leonel de los Santos (DOM)	Carlos Quipo (ECU)
Light flyweight (~49 kg)	Yuberjen Martínez (COL)	Leonel de los Santos (DOM)	Isaac Herrera (PER)
Flyweight (~52 kg)	Ceiber Ávila (COL)	Eduard Bermúdez (VEN)	Gerardo Valdez (DOM)
Flyweight (~52 kg)	Ceiber Ávila (COL)	Eduard Bermúdez (VEN)	Danilo Fernández (ECU)
Bantamweight (~56 kg)	Héctor García (DOM)	Joel Luis (PER)	Segundo David Padilla (ECU)
Bantamweight (~56 kg)	Héctor García (DOM)	Joel Luis (PER)	Yonni Blanco (VEN)
Lightweight (~60 kg)	Luis Arcon (VEN)	Alfredo Santiago (DOM)	Faider Hernändez (COL)
Lightweight (~60 kg)	Luis Arcon (VEN)	Alfredo Santiago (DOM)	Jaime Arboleda (PAN)
Light welterweight (~64 kg)	Carlos Adames (DOM)	Jonathan Valarezo (ECU)	Eduar Marriaga (COL)
Light welterweight (~64 kg)	Carlos Adames (DOM)	Jonathan Valarezo (ECU)	Yoelvis Hernández (VEN)
Welterweight (~69 kg)	Gabriel Maestre (VEN)	Carlos Sánchez (ECU)	Daniel Muñoz (CHI)
Welterweight (~69 kg)	Gabriel Maestre (VEN)	Carlos Sánchez (ECU)	Juver Renteria (COL)
Middleweight (~75 kg)	Jorge Vivas (COL)	Marlo Delgado (ECU)	José Alfaro (BOL)
Middleweight (~75 kg)	Jorge Vivas (COL)	Marlo Delgado (ECU)	Joan Santos (DOM)
Light heavyweight (~81 kg)	Carlos Minao (ECU)	Juan Carrillo (COL)	Miguel Ugarte (BOL)
Light heavyweight (~81 kg)	Carlos Minao (ECU)	Juan Carrillo (COL)	Jose Lucar (PER)
Heavyweight (~91 kg)	Julio Castillo (ECU)	Miguel Veliz (CHI)	Alfonso Flores (VEN)
Heavyweight (~91 kg)	Julio Castillo (ECU)	Miguel Veliz (CHI)	Rodrigo Carbajal (BOL)
Super heavyweight (+91 kg)	Jose Payares (VEN)	Deivis Blanco (COL)	Jorge Quiñonez (ECU)
Super heavyweight (+91 kg)	Jose Payares (VEN)	Deivis Blanco (COL)	Rolando Bermudez (PAN)

=== Women's events ===
Event	Gold	Silver	Bronze
Flyweight (~51 kg)	Karlha Magliocco (VEN)	Ingrit Valencia (COL)	Verónica García (BOL)
Flyweight (~51 kg)	Karlha Magliocco (VEN)	Ingrit Valencia (COL)	Lucy Valdivia (PER)
Light welterweight (~60 kg)	Karol Hibbert (PAN)	Yeni Arias (COL)	Jessica Vargas (BOL)
Light welterweight (~60 kg)	Karol Hibbert (PAN)	Yeni Arias (COL)	Natalia Matus (CHI)
Light heavyweight (~75 kg)	Yenebier Guillen (DOM)	Jessica Caicedo (COL)	Atheyna Bylon (PAN)
Light heavyweight (~75 kg)	Yenebier Guillen (DOM)	Jessica Caicedo (COL)	Francelis Carmona (VEN)
