= Boxing at the 2011 Pan American Games – Flyweight =

Men's flyweight at the 2011 Pan American Games
- Venue: Expo Guadalajara Arena
- Dates: October 22 – 29
- Competitors: 10 from 10 nations

Medalists
Gold medal	Robeisy Ramirez	Cuba
Silver medal	Dagoberto Aguero	Dominican Republic
Bronze medal	Braulio Avila	Mexico
Bronze medal	Julião Henriques Neto	Brazil

The men's flyweight competition of the boxing events at the 2011 Pan American Games in Guadalajara, Mexico, was held between October 21 and 28 at the Expo Guadalajara Arena. The defending champion was McWilliams Arroyo from Puerto Rico, who had since debuted as a professional. Flyweights were limited to those boxers weighing less than or equal to 52 kilograms.

Like all Pan American boxing events, the competition was a straight single-elimination tournament. Both semifinal losers were awarded bronze medals, so no boxers competed again after their first loss. Bouts consisted of four rounds of two minutes each, with one-minute breaks between rounds. Punches scored only if the white area on the front of the glove made full contact with the front of the head or torso of the opponent. Five judges scored each bout; three of the judges had to signal a scoring punch within one second for the punch to score. The winner of the bout was the boxer who scored the most valid punches by the end of the bout.

== Results ==
All times are Central Standard Time (UTC-6).

=== Bracket ===
Round of 16; October 22, 2011; 18:00
Eddie Valenzuela (GUA)	22
Marvin Solano (NCA)	10
Oscar Negrete (COL)	9
Braulio Avila (MEX)	16

Quarterfinals; October 24, 2011; 14:00
Dagoberto Aguero (DOM)	20
Eddie Valenzuela (GUA)	13
Julião Henriques Neto (BRA)	25
Jhon Corona (ESA)	5
John Franklin (USA)
Robeisy Ramirez (CUB)	RSC
Braulio Avila (MEX)	17
Jose Meza (ECU)	12

Semifinals; October 26, 2011; 19:00
Dagoberto Aguero (DOM)	21
Julião Henriques Neto (BRA)	11
Robeisy Ramirez (CUB)	20
Braulio Avila (MEX)	7

Finals; October 29, 2011; 19:00
Dagoberto Aguero (DOM)	10
Robeisy Ramirez (CUB)	24
