= Boxing at the 2011 Pan American Games – Welterweight =

Men's welterweight at the 2011 Pan American Games
- Venue: Expo Guadalajara Arena
- Dates: October 22 – 29
- Competitors: 11 from 11 nations

Medalists
Gold medal	Carlos Banteux	Cuba
Silver medal	Oscar Molina	Mexico
Bronze medal	Mian Hussain	Canada
Bronze medal	Myke Carvalho	Brazil

The men's welterweight competition of the boxing events at the 2011 Pan American Games in Guadalajara, Mexico, was held between October 21 and 28 at the Expo Guadalajara Arena. The defending champion was Karl Dargan from the United States. Welterweights were limited to those boxers weighing less than or equal to 69 kilograms.

Like all Pan American boxing events, the competition was a straight single-elimination tournament. Both semifinal losers were awarded bronze medals, so no boxers competed again after their first loss. Bouts consisted of four rounds of two minutes each, with one-minute breaks between rounds. Punches scored only if the white area on the front of the glove made full contact with the front of the head or torso of the opponent. Five judges scored each bout; three of the judges had to signal a scoring punch within one second for the punch to score. The winner of the bout was the boxer who scored the most valid punches by the end of the bout.

== Results ==
All times are Central Standard Time (UTC-6).

=== Bracket ===
Round of 16; October 22, 2011; 18:00
Mian Hussain (CAN)	20
Emmanuel De Jesus (PUR)	13
Raul Sanchez (DOM)	18
Myke Carvalho (BRA)	23
Carlos Banteux (CUB)	15
Alberto Palmetta (ARG)	5

Quarterfinals; October 24, 2011; 18:00
Luis Miranda (PER)	8
Mian Hussain (CAN)	21
Carlos Sanchez (ECU)	11
Oscar Molina (MEX)	13
Patricio Villagra (CHI)	8
Myke Carvalho (BRA)	30
Carlos Banteux (CUB)	20
Gabriel Maestre (VEN)	7

Semifinals; October 26, 2011; 19:00
Mian Hussain (CAN)	7
Oscar Molina (MEX)	14
Myke Carvalho (BRA)	14
Carlos Banteux (CUB)	14+

Finals; October 29, 2011; 19:00
Oscar Molina (MEX)	13
Carlos Banteux (CUB)	20
