= Boxing at the 2011 Pan American Games – Super heavyweight =

Men's Super heavyweight at the 2011 Pan American Games
- Venue: Expo Guadalajara Arena
- Dates: October 24 – 29
- Competitors: 8 from 8 nations

Medalists
Gold medal	Italo Perea	Ecuador
Silver medal	Juan Hiracheta	Mexico
Bronze medal	Isaia Mena	Colombia
Bronze medal	Gerardo Bisbal	Puerto Rico

The men's super heavyweight competition of the boxing events at the 2011 Pan American Games in Guadalajara, Mexico, was held between October 24 and 29 at the Expo Guadalajara Arena. The defending champion was Robert Alfonso from Cuba. Super heavyweights were limited to those boxers weighing higher than or equal to 91 kilograms. This weight category is the heaviest out of the ten boxing events.

Like all Pan American boxing events, the competition was a straight single-elimination tournament. Both semifinal losers were awarded bronze medals, so no boxers competed again after their first loss. Bouts consisted of four rounds of two minutes each, with one-minute breaks between rounds. Punches scored only if the white area on the front of the glove made full contact with the front of the head or torso of the opponent. Five judges scored each bout; three of the judges had to signal a scoring punch within one second for the punch to score. The winner of the bout was the boxer who scored the most valid punches by the end of the bout.

== Schedule ==
All times are Central Standard Time (UTC-6).

Date	Time	Round
October 24, 2011	18:00	Quarterfinals
October 26, 2011	19:00	Semifinals
October 29, 2011	19:00	Final

== Results ==
=== Bracket ===
Quarterfinals
Cristian Cabrera (DOM)	10
Italo Perea (ECU)	20
Gerardo Bisbal (PUR)	20
Clayton Laurent (ISV)	11
Isaia Mena (COL)	13
Danny Kelly (USA)	11
Jose Payares (VEN)
Juan Hiracheta (MEX)	RSC

Semifinals
Italo Perea (ECU)	KO
Gerardo Bisbal (PUR)
Isaia Mena (COL)	13
Juan Hiracheta (MEX)	19

Finals
Italo Perea (ECU)	20
Juan Hiracheta (MEX)	13
