= Boxing at the 2011 Pan American Games – Middleweight =

Men's middleweight at the 2011 Pan American Games
- Venue: Expo Guadalajara Arena
- Dates: October 21 — October 28
- Competitors: 12 from 12 nations

Medalists
Gold medal	Emilio Correa	Cuba
Silver medal	Jaime Cortez	Ecuador
Bronze medal	Juan Carlos Rodríguez	Venezuela
Bronze medal	Brody Blair	Canada

The men's middleweight competition of the boxing events at the 2011 Pan American Games in Guadalajara, Mexico, was held between October 21 and 28 at the Expo Guadalajara Arena. The defending champion was Emilio Correa from Cuba. Middleweights were limited to those boxers weighing less than or equal to 75 kilograms.

Like all Pan American boxing events, the competition was a straight single-elimination tournament. Both semifinal losers were awarded bronze medals, so no boxers competed again after their first loss. Bouts consisted of four rounds of two minutes each, with one-minute breaks between rounds. Punches scored only if the white area on the front of the glove made full contact with the front of the head or torso of the opponent. Five judges scored each bout; three of the judges had to signal a scoring punch within one second for the punch to score. The winner of the bout was the boxer who scored the most valid punches by the end of the bout.

== Results ==
All times are Central Standard Time (UTC−6).

=== Bracket ===
Round of 16; October 21, 2011; 18:00
Andrew Fermin (TRI)	RET
Juan Carlos Rodríguez (VEN)
Rowain Christopher (DMA)
Junior Castillo (DOM)	KO
Juan Mercado (MEX)	DSQ
Mario Bernal (ESA)
Damarias Russell (USA)	4
Emilio Correa (CUB)	27

Quarterfinals; October 23, 2011; 18:00
Reece Shagourie (JAM)	10
Juan Carlos Rodríguez (VEN)	16
Junior Castillo (DOM)	8
Jaime Cortez (ECU)	15
Brody Blair (CAN)	24
Mario Bernal (ESA)	12
Emilio Correa (CUB)	12
David Da Costa (BRA)	4

Semifinals; October 25, 2011; 19:00
Juan Carlos Rodríguez (VEN)	8
Jaime Cortez (ECU)	14
Brody Blair (CAN)	7
Emilio Correa (CUB)	30

Finals; October 28, 2011; 19:00
Jaime Cortez (ECU)	6
Emilio Correa (CUB)	18
