= Boxing at the 2015 Pan American Games – Men's flyweight =

Men's flyweight at the 2015 Pan American Games
- Venue: Oshawa Sports Centre
- Dates: July 19–25
- Competitors: 10 from 10 nations

Medalists
Gold medal	Antonio Vargas	United States
Silver medal	Yosvany Veitía	Cuba
Bronze medal	Ceiber Ávila	Colombia
Bronze medal	David Jimenez	Costa Rica

The men's flyweight competition of the boxing events at the 2015 Pan American Games in Toronto, Ontario, Canada, was held between the 19 and 25 of July at the Oshawa Sports Centre. The defending champion is Robeisy Ramirez of Mexico. Flyweights is limited to those boxers weighing less than or equal to 52 kilograms.

Like all Pan American boxing events, the competition is a straight single-elimination tournament. Both semifinal losers are awarded bronze medals, so no boxers compete again after their first loss. Bouts consist of a 3 rounds "10-point must" scoring system used in the pro game, where the winner of each round must be awarded 10 points and the loser a lesser amount, and the elimination of the padded headgear. Five judges scored each bout. The winner will be the boxer who scored the most at the end of the match.

== Qualification ==
A total of ten boxers qualified to compete.

== Results ==
=== Bracket ===
Preliminaries; July 19, 2015
Julião Henriques (BRA)	1
Eddi Valenzuela (GUA)	2
Antonio Vargas (USA)	2
Leonel de los Santos (DOM)	1

Quarterfinals; July 21, 2015
Yosvany Veitía (CUB)	3
Eddi Valenzuela (GUA)	0
Eduard Bermúdez (VEN)	0
Ceiber Ávila (COL)	3
Orlando Huitzil (MEX)	0
David Jimenez (CRC)	3
Antonio Vargas (USA)	2
Jeyvier Cintrón (PUR)	1

Semifinals; July 23, 2015
Yosvany Veitía (CUB)	3
Ceiber Ávila (COL)	0
David Jimenez (CRC)	1
Antonio Vargas (USA)	2

Finals; July 25, 2015
Yosvany Veitía (CUB)	0
Antonio Vargas (USA)	3
