= Puerto Rico at the 2012 Summer Olympics =

- IOC code: PUR
- NOC: Puerto Rico Olympic Committee
- Website: www.copur.pr (in Spanish)

in London
- Competitors: 25 in 8 sports
- Flag bearer: Javier Culson
- Medals Ranked 63rd: Gold 0 Silver 1 Bronze 1 Total 2

Summer Olympics appearances (overview)
- 1948; 1952; 1956; 1960; 1964; 1968; 1972; 1976; 1980; 1984; 1988; 1992; 1996; 2000; 2004; 2008; 2012; 2016; 2020; 2024

Puerto Rico competed at the 2012 Summer Olympics in London, United Kingdom from July 27 to August 12, 2012. This was the nation's seventeenth consecutive appearance at the Olympics.

Comité Olímpico de Puerto Rico sent a total of 25 athletes to the Games, 19 men and 6 women, to compete in 8 sports. The nation's team size was roughly larger by three athletes from Beijing. This was also the youngest delegation in Puerto Rico's Olympic history, with half the team under the age of 25, and many of them were expected to reach their peak in time for the 2016 Olympics in Rio de Janeiro. Four Puerto Rican athletes had competed in Beijing, including track star and pre-Olympic favorite Javier Culson, who held the record as the "world's fastest man" in the hurdles, and later became the nation's flag bearer at the opening ceremony. Canterbury Christ Church University had been selected as the team's preparation base for these Olympic games.

These Games tied as Puerto Rico's most successful Olympics, winning a total of two medals, and tying the record for the most medals with Los Angeles at a single games. Javier Culson won the nation's first ever medal in the men's hurdles and their first bronze in 16 years. Meanwhile, Dominican born Jaime Espinal became the first Puerto Rican athlete to claim an Olympic silver medal in men's freestyle wrestling, and set a historic Olympic record as the nation's second silver medalist, 28 years after Luis Ortiz had become the first.

== Medalists ==
Medal	Name	Sport	Event	Date
Silver	Jaime Espinal	Wrestling	Men's freestyle 84 kg	August 11
Bronze	Javier Culson	Athletics	Men's 400 m hurdles	August 6

== Athletics ==
Puerto Rican athletes have so far achieved qualifying standards in the following athletics events (up to a maximum of 3 athletes in each event at the 'A' Standard, and 1 at the 'B' Standard):

Key

- Note–Ranks given for track events are within the athlete's heat only
- Q = Qualified for the next round
- q = Qualified for the next round as a fastest loser or, in field events, by position without achieving the qualifying target
- NR = National record
- N/A = Round not applicable for the event
- Bye = Athlete not required to compete in round

Men

Athlete	Event	Heat		Quarterfinal		Semifinal		Final	
Athlete	Event	Result	Rank	Result	Rank	Result	Rank	Result	Rank
Eric Alejandro	400 m hurdles	49.39	4 q	—		49.15	7	Did not advance	
Héctor Cotto	110 m hurdles	14.08	8	—		Did not advance			
Javier Culson	400 m hurdles	48.33	1 Q	—		47.93	1 Q	48.10	3rd place, bronze medalist(s)
Enrique Llanos	110 m hurdles	DNF		—		Did not advance			
Miguel López	100 m	Bye		10.31	5	Did not advance			
Jamele Mason Vegas	400 m hurdles	49.89	5	—		Did not advance			
Samuel Vázquez	1500 m	3:49.19	14	—		Did not advance			
Wesley Vázquez	800 m	1:46.45	4	—		Did not advance			

Women

Athlete	Event	Heat		Semifinal		Final	
Athlete	Event	Result	Rank	Result	Rank	Result	Rank
Beverly Ramos	3000 m steeplechase	9:55.26	12	—		Did not advance	
Carol Rodríguez	400 m	52.19	2 Q	52.08	6	Did not advance	

== Boxing ==
Men

Athlete	Event	Round of 32	Round of 16	Quarterfinals	Semifinals	Final	
Athlete	Event	Opposition Result	Opposition Result	Opposition Result	Opposition Result	Opposition Result	Rank
Jantony Ortiz	Light flyweight	Sulemanu (GHA); W 20–6	Ayrapetyan (RUS); L 13–15	Did not advance			
Jeyvier Cintrón	Flyweight	Oteng (BOT); W 14–12	Henriques (BRA); W 18–13	Aloyan (RUS); L 13–23	Did not advance		
Félix Verdejo	Lightweight	Huertas (PAN); W 11–5	Mejri (TUN); W 16–7	Lomachenko (UKR); L 9–14	Did not advance		
Francisco Vargas Ramirez	Light welterweight	Yigit (SWE); L 9–13	Did not advance				
Enrique Collazo	Middleweight	Hartel (GER); L 10–18	Did not advance				

== Gymnastics ==
=== Artistic ===
Men

Athlete	Event	Qualification								Final							
Athlete	Event	Apparatus						Total	Rank	Apparatus						Total	Rank
Athlete	Event	F	PH	R	V	PB	HB	Total	Rank	F	PH	R	V	PB	HB	Total	Rank
Tommy Ramos	Rings	—		15.500	—			15.500	6 Q	—		15.600	—			15.600	6

Women

Athlete	Event	Qualification						Final					
Athlete	Event	Apparatus				Total	Rank	Apparatus				Total	Rank
Athlete	Event	F	V	UB	BB	Total	Rank	F	V	UB	BB	Total	Rank
Lorena Quiñones	All-around	11.366	13.800	10.766	13.133	49.065	54	Did not advance					

== Judo ==
Athlete	Event	Round of 32	Round of 16	Quarterfinals	Semifinals	Repechage	Final / BM	
Athlete	Event	Opposition Result	Opposition Result	Opposition Result	Opposition Result	Opposition Result	Opposition Result	Rank
Melissa Mojica	Women's +78 kg	Shahrkhani (KSA); W 0100–0000	Ivashchenko (RUS); L 0000–0101	Did not advance				

== Shooting ==
Men

Athlete	Event	Qualification		Final	
Athlete	Event	Points	Rank	Points	Rank
José Torres Laboy	Double trap	127	21	Did not advance	

== Swimming ==
Puerto Rican swimmers have so far achieved qualifying standards in the 200 m freestyle and 50 m freestyle events (up to a maximum of 2 swimmers in each event at the Olympic Qualifying Time (OQT), and potentially 1 at the Olympic Selection Time (OST)) Vanessa García and Raúl Martínez, were invited directly by FINA, to participate in the 50 m freestyle and 200 m freestyle respectively.

Men

Athlete	Event	Heat		Semifinal		Final	
Athlete	Event	Time	Rank	Time	Rank	Time	Rank
Raúl Martínez Colomer	200 m freestyle	1:54.23	38	Did not advance			

Women

Athlete	Event	Heat		Semifinal		Final	
Athlete	Event	Time	Rank	Time	Rank	Time	Rank
Vanessa García	50 m freestyle	25.58	29	Did not advance			

== Weightlifting ==
Lely Burgos, did not obtain the qualification for the 2012 Summer Olympics directly in the Americas Olympic Qualifying, but for her effort, she was invited directly by the International Weightlifting Federation.

Athlete	Event	Snatch		Clean & Jerk		Total	Rank
Athlete	Event	Result	Rank	Result	Rank	Total	Rank
Lely Burgos	Women's −48 kg	65	11	92	10	157	11

== Wrestling ==
Puerto Rico has qualified three quota places.

Key:

- VT - Victory by Fall.
- PP - Decision by Points - the loser with technical points.
- PO - Decision by Points - the loser without technical points.

Men's freestyle

Athlete	Event	Qualification	Round of 16	Quarterfinal	Semifinal	Repechage 1	Repechage 2	Final / BM	
Athlete	Event	Opposition Result	Opposition Result	Opposition Result	Opposition Result	Opposition Result	Opposition Result	Opposition Result	Rank
Franklin Gómez	−60 kg	Kudukhov (RUS); L 1–3 ^{PP}	Did not advance			Dutt (IND); L 0–3 ^{PO}	Did not advance		15
Francisco Soler	−74 kg	Bye	Burroughs (USA); L 0–3 ^{PO}	Did not advance		Bye	Gentry (CAN); L 0–3 ^{PO}	Did not advance	19
Jaime Espinal	−84 kg	Bye	Dick (NGR); W 3–1 ^{PP}	Marsagishvili (GEO); W 3–1 ^{PP}	Gattsiev (BLR); W 3–1 ^{PP}	Bye		Sharifov (AZE); L 0–3 ^{PP}	2nd place, silver medalist(s)

== See also ==
- Puerto Rico at the 2011 Pan American Games
