= Boxing at the 2011 Pan American Games =

- Venue: Expo Guadalajara Arena
- Dates: October 21 – October 29
- No. of events: 13 (10 men, 3 women)
- Competitors: 119 from 24 nations

Boxing competitions at the 2011 Pan American Games in Guadalajara were held from October 21 to October 29 at the Expo Guadalajara Arena. Both the Bahamas and Barbados won their first ever Pan American boxing medals.

== Medal summary ==
=== Medal table ===
* Host nation (Mexico)

Rank	Nation	Gold	Silver	Bronze	Total
1	Cuba	8	1	0	9
2	Canada	2	0	3	5
3	Mexico*	1	4	4	9
4	Ecuador	1	2	1	4
5	Puerto Rico	1	0	3	4
6	Brazil	0	2	5	7
7	Dominican Republic	0	2	1	3
8	Colombia	0	1	1	2
9	Bahamas	0	1	0	1
10	Venezuela	0	0	4	4
11	Argentina	0	0	3	3
12	Barbados	0	0	1	1
Totals (12 entries)		13	13	26	52

=== Men's events ===
Event	Gold	Silver	Bronze
Light flyweight	Joselito Velázquez; Mexico	Yosbany Veitía; Cuba	Jantony Ortiz; Puerto Rico
Light flyweight	Joselito Velázquez; Mexico	Yosbany Veitía; Cuba	Juan Medina; Dominican Republic
Flyweight	Robeisy Ramírez; Cuba	Dagoberto Aguero; Dominican Republic	Braulio Ávila; Mexico
Flyweight	Robeisy Ramírez; Cuba	Dagoberto Aguero; Dominican Republic	Julião Henriques; Brazil
Bantamweight	Lázaro Álvarez; Cuba	Óscar Valdez; Mexico	Angel Rodriguez; Venezuela
Bantamweight	Lázaro Álvarez; Cuba	Óscar Valdez; Mexico	Robenílson de Jesus; Brazil
Lightweight	Yasnier Toledo; Cuba	Robson Conceição; Brazil	Ángel Suárez; Puerto Rico
Lightweight	Yasnier Toledo; Cuba	Robson Conceição; Brazil	Ángel Gutiérrez; Mexico
Light welterweight	Roniel Iglesias; Cuba	Valentino Knowles; Bahamas	Joelvis Hernandes; Venezuela
Light welterweight	Roniel Iglesias; Cuba	Valentino Knowles; Bahamas	Éverton Lopes; Brazil
Welterweight	Carlos Banteux; Cuba	Óscar Molina; Mexico	Mian Hussain; Canada
Welterweight	Carlos Banteux; Cuba	Óscar Molina; Mexico	Myke Carvalho; Brazil
Middleweight	Emilio Correa; Cuba	Jaime Cortez; Ecuador	Juan Carlos Rodriguez; Venezuela
Middleweight	Emilio Correa; Cuba	Jaime Cortez; Ecuador	Brody Blair; Canada
Light heavyweight	Julio César La Cruz; Cuba	Yamaguchi Florentino; Brazil	Carlos Góngora; Ecuador
Light heavyweight	Julio César La Cruz; Cuba	Yamaguchi Florentino; Brazil	Armando Pina; Mexico
Heavyweight	Lenier Pero; Cuba	Julio Castillo; Ecuador	Yamil Peralta; Argentina
Heavyweight	Lenier Pero; Cuba	Julio Castillo; Ecuador	Anderson Emmanuel; Barbados
Super heavyweight	Ítalo Perea; Ecuador	Juan Hiracheta; Mexico	Isaia Mena; Colombia
Super heavyweight	Ítalo Perea; Ecuador	Juan Hiracheta; Mexico	Gerardo Bisbal; Puerto Rico

=== Women's events ===
Event	Gold	Silver	Bronze
Flyweight	Mandy Bujold; Canada	Ingrit Valencia; Colombia	Pamela Benavidez; Argentina
Flyweight	Mandy Bujold; Canada	Ingrit Valencia; Colombia	Karlha Magliocco; Venezuela
Light welterweight	Kiria Tapia; Puerto Rico	Erika Cruz; Mexico	Sandra Bizier; Canada
Light welterweight	Kiria Tapia; Puerto Rico	Erika Cruz; Mexico	Adela Peralta; Argentina
Light heavyweight	Mary Spencer; Canada	Yenebier Guillén; Dominican Republic	Roseli Feitosa; Brazil
Light heavyweight	Mary Spencer; Canada	Yenebier Guillén; Dominican Republic	Alma Ibarra; Mexico

== Schedule ==
All times are Central Daylight Time (UTC-5).

Day	Date	Start	Finish	Event	Phase
Day 8	Friday October 21, 2011	18:00	22:00	Men's 49 kg, 64 kg, 75 kg, 91 kg	Preliminaries
Day 8	Friday October 21, 2011	18:00	22:00	Women's 51 kg	Quarterfinals
Day 9	Saturday October 22, 2011	18:00	21:30	Men's 52 kg, 56 kg, 60 kg, 69 kg	Preliminaries
Day 9	Saturday October 22, 2011	18:00	21:30	Women's 60 kg	Quarterfinals
Day 10	Sunday October 23, 2011	14:00	16:45	Men's 49 kg, 56 kg	Quarterfinals
Day 10	Sunday October 23, 2011	14:00	16:45	Women's 75 kg	Quarterfinals
Day 10	Sunday October 23, 2011	18:00	21:00	Men's 64 kg, 75 kg, 91 kg	Quarterfinals
Day 11	Monday October 24, 2011	14:00	16:45	Men's 52 kg, 60 kg	Quarterfinals
Day 11	Monday October 24, 2011	18:00	21:00	Men's 69 kg, 81 kg, +91 kg	Quarterfinals
Day 12	Tuesday October 25, 2011	19:00	22:00	Men's 49 kg, 56 kg, 64 kg, 75 kg, 91 kg	Semifinals
Day 12	Tuesday October 25, 2011	19:00	22:00	Women's 51 kg	Semifinals
Day 13	Wednesday October 26, 2011	19:00	22:30	Men's 52 kg, 60 kg, 69 kg, 81 kg, +91 kg	Semifinals
Day 13	Wednesday October 26, 2011	19:00	22:30	Women's 60 kg, 75 kg	Semifinals
Day 15	Friday October 28, 2011	19:00	21:30	Men's 49 kg, 56 kg, 64 kg, 75 kg, 91 kg	Finals
Day 15	Friday October 28, 2011	19:00	21:30	Women's 75 kg	Finals
Day 16	Saturday October 29, 2011	19:00	21:55	Men's 52 kg, 60 kg, 69 kg, 81 kg, +91 kg	Finals
Day 16	Saturday October 29, 2011	19:00	21:55	Women's 51 kg, 60 kg	Finals

== Qualification ==
There were three qualifying tournaments.

For the women's events, the two finalists from each tournament and one host nation athlete qualified for a total of 7 athletes. For the men's categories, there are different amount of spots available for each weight class.

=== Qualification timeline ===
Event	Date	Venue
Pan American Games Qualifier 1	March 25 to March 30, 2011	(Venezuela) Cumaná
Pan American Games Qualifier 2	April 30 to May 6, 2011	(Ecuador) Quito
Pan American Games Qualifier 3	July 1 to July 8, 2011	Panama City

=== Summary ===
NOC	Men										Women			Total
NOC	-49kg	-52kg	-56kg	-60kg	-64kg	-69kg	-75kg	-81kg	-91kg	+91kg	-51kg	-60kg	-75kg	Total
Argentina	X		X		X	X			X		X	X		7
Bahamas					X									1
Barbados				X					X					2
Brazil		X	X	X	X	X	X	X				X	X	9
Canada			X			X	X		X		X	X	X	7
Chile						X								1
Colombia	X	X	X	X				X	X	X	X	X		9
Costa Rica	X										X			2
Cuba	X	X	X	X	X	X	X	X	X	X				10
Dominica							X							1
Dominican Republic	X	X	X	X	X	X	X	X	X	X			X	11
Ecuador	X	X	X	X	X	X	X	X	X	X				10
El Salvador		X					X							2
Guatemala		X			X									2
Jamaica							X							1
Mexico	X	X	X	X	X	X	X	X	X	X	X	X	X	13
Nicaragua		X		X	X								X	4
Panama	X				X									2
Peru						X								1
Puerto Rico	X		X	X	X	X		X		X		X		9
Trinidad and Tobago							X							1
United States		X		X		X	X	X		X	X	X	X	9
Venezuela	X		X	X	X	X	X		X	X	X			9
Virgin Islands										X			X	2
Total: 24 NOCs	10	10	10	11	12	12	12	8	9	9	7	7	7	124

== See also ==
- Boxing at the Pan American Games
