= Francisco Vargas =

Francisco Vargas may refer to:

- Francisco Vargas (athlete) (born 1963), Colombian Olympic racewalker
- Francisco Vargas (Mexican boxer) (born 1984), Mexican lightweight boxer
- Francisco Vargas (Puerto Rican boxer), Puerto Rican light welterweight boxer
