= Marriaga =

Marriaga is a surname of Basque origins. Notable people with the surname include:

- Eduar Marriaga, Colombian boxer
- Miguel Marriaga (born 1984), Venezuelan basketball player
- Miguel Marriaga (born 1986), Colombian boxer
- Jesús Marriaga (born 1998), Colombian baseball player
