= Custio Clayton =

Canadian boxer (born 1987)

Personal information
- Nickname: War Machine
- Born: Custio Clayton; October 5, 1987 (age 38) Dartmouth, Nova Scotia, Canada
- Height: 5 ft 9 in (175 cm)
- Weight: Welterweight; Light middleweight

Boxing career
- Stance: Orthodox

Boxing record
- Total fights: 22
- Wins: 20
- Win by KO: 12
- Losses: 1
- Draws: 1

Custio Clayton (born October 5, 1987) is a Canadian professional boxer who has held the WBA-NABA welterweight title since 2019. As an amateur he is a six-time Canadian national champion and represented Canada at 2 commonwealth games and the 2012 Olympics, where he reached the quarter-finals. He began boxing at the age of 9 with his uncle Gary Johnson.

== Amateur career ==
Clayton began training at his great-uncle's gym, City of Lakes Boxing Club in Dartmouth, Nova Scotia, and fought his first amateur bout at the age of 11. He took a break from boxing for two years at the age of 17 to finish high school. The 24-year-old Nova Scotian Olympian Clayton, along with Simon Kean, were the only two Canadian male boxers to qualify for the 2012 Olympics.

Clayton was a quarter-finalist and 5th-place finisher at welterweight at the 2012 American Boxing Olympic Qualification Tournament. Five spots were available for qualification at welterweight and Custio qualified over the other quarter-finalists since his loss was to the eventual winner Myke Carvalho. Qualification being dependent on how the winning opponents performed in later rounds was controversial and will not be used in future Olympics. At the 2012 Summer Olympics (results) Clayton became the first Canadian to win a boxing bout in 8 years when he beat Óscar Molina in the opening round. Then he beat the Australian Cameron Hammond, before losing to Fred Evans in the quarterfinal.

== Professional career ==
Clayton officially joined the Groupe Yvon Michel (GYM) in November 2014. The Nova Scotia boxer has indeed accepted a contract with a maximum duration of three years, the latest of which is an option. His first professional fight took place on December 19, 2014, at division light middleweight in gala undercard featuring Adonis Stevenson in Quebec City.

On 28 January 2020, Clayton scored an eighth-round knockout of Diego (El Chacarero) Ramirez and retain his WBA title.

On October 24, 2020, Clayton fought former world champion Sergey Lipinets for the interim IBF world title, where the fight ended in a draw.

May 14, 2022, Clayton recorded his first loss against Jaron (boots) Ennis in an eliminator fight.

== Professional boxing record ==
21 fights	19 wins	1 loss
By knockout	12	1
By decision	7	0
Draws	1	

No.	Result	Record	Opponent	Type	Round, time	Date	Location	Notes
22	Win	20–1–1	Courtney Pennington	SD	10	Feb 2, 2024	Scotiabank Centre, Halifax, Nova Scotia, Canada	
21	Loss	19–1–1	Jaron Ennis	KO	2 (12), 2:49	May 14, 2022	Dignity Health Sports Park, Carson, California, U.S.	
20	Win	19–0–1	Cameron Krael	UD	10	Dec 11, 2021	Dignity Health Sports Park, Carson, California, US	
19	Draw	18–0–1	Sergey Lipinets	MD	12	Oct 24, 2020	Mohegan Sun Arena, Uncasville, Connecticut, US	For IBF interim welterweight title
18	Win	18–0	Diego Ramirez	KO	8 (10), 0:26	Jan 28, 2020	Danforth Music Hall, Toronto, Ontario, Canada	Retained WBA-NABA welterweight title
17	Win	17–0	Johan Pérez	UD	10	Jun 29, 2019	Scotiabank Convention Centre, Niagara Falls, Canada	Won vacant WBA-NABA and WBO International welterweight titles
16	Win	16–0	DeMarcus Corley	KO	6 (8), 0:36	Mar 29, 2019	The Mattamy Events Centre, Toronto, Ontario, Canada	
15	Win	15–0	Stephen Danyo	UD	12	May 26, 2018	Videotron Centre, Quebec City, Quebec, Canada	Retained WBO International welterweight title; Won vacant IBF Inter-Continental welterweight title
14	Win	14–0	Gabor Kovacs	KO	1 (10), 0:28	Mar 31, 2018	Montreal Casino, Montreal, Quebec, Canada	
13	Win	13–0	Cristian Rafael Coria	UD	10	Dec 16, 2017	Place Bell, Laval, Quebec, Canada	Won vacant WBO International welterweight title
12	Win	12–0	Johnny Navarrete	UD	10	Jun 15, 2017	Montreal Casino, Montreal, Quebec, Canada	Won vacant WBC Continental Americas and IBF International welterweight titles
11	Win	11–0	Alfredo Chávez	KO	1 (8), 3:00	Apr 15, 2017	Civic Complex, Cornwall, Ontario, Canada	
10	Win	10–0	Ramses Agaton	KO	8 (10), 2:47	Oct 20, 2016	Montreal Casino, Montreal, Quebec, Canada	
9	Win	9–0	Silverio Ortiz	UD	6	Jul 29, 2016	Videotron Centre, Quebec City, Quebec, Canada	
8	Win	8–0	José Emilio Perea	KO	10 (10), 0:45	May 24, 2016	Montreal Casino, Montreal, Quebec, Canada	
7	Win	7–0	Hector Munoz	TKO	9 (10), 2:54	Mar 17, 2016	Montreal Casino, Montreal, Quebec, Canada	
6	Win	6–0	Stanislas Salmon	TKO	2 (8), 0:49	Jan 21, 2016	Montreal Casino, Montreal, Quebec, Canada	
5	Win	5–0	Ivan Pereyra	TKO	2 (8), 1:20	Nov 28, 2015	Videotron Centre, Quebec City, Quebec, Canada	
4	Win	4–0	Zaurs Sadihovs	TKO	1 (6), 2:46	Jun 26, 2015	Holiday Inn, Pointe-Claire, Quebec, Canada	
3	Win	3–0	Ronald Berti	TKO	2 (6), 1:48	Apr 4, 2015	Colisée Pepsi, Quebec City, Quebec, Canada	
2	Win	2–0	Eduards Gerasimovs	TKO	1 (6), 0:50	Jan 31, 2015	Hilton Lac Leamy, Gatineau, Quebec, Canada	
1	Win	1–0	Sophyan Haoud	UD	4	Dec 19, 2014	Colisée Pepsi, Quebec City, Quebec, Canada	
