= Carlos Suárez (boxer) =

Trinidad and Tobago boxer (born 1993)

Carlos Suarez
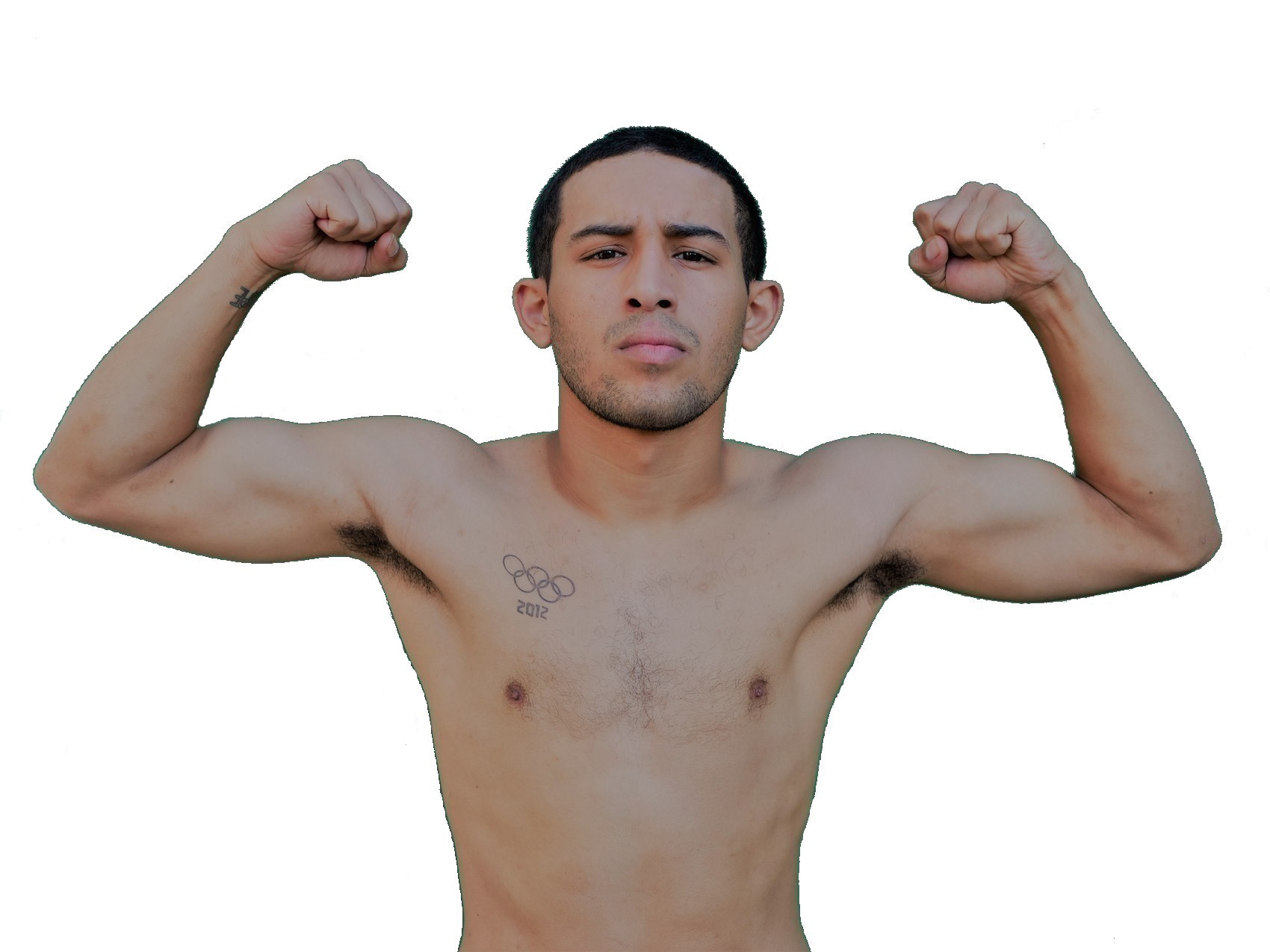

Personal information
- Nickname: Simply the Best
- Born: Carlos Antonio Suarez; June 6, 1993 (age 33) Lima, Ohio, U.S.
- Height: 5 ft 5 in (167 cm)
- Weight: Light flyweight; Flyweight; Super flyweight; Bantamweight

Boxing career
- Stance: Orthodox

Boxing record
- Total fights: 11
- Wins: 7
- Win by KO: 5
- Losses: 3
- Draws: 1

Carlos Antonio Suárez (born June 6, 1993) is an American born Trinidadian boxer who competed at the 2012 Summer Olympics in London, England in the light flyweight division where he lost a very disputed first-round decision to Ferhat Pehlivan of Turkey. At the age of 16 in 2010 Carlos won gold at the Under-19 National Championships in Cincinnati, Ohio winning 15-7 over Rondarrius Hunter in the final round bout. Suarez earned a bronze medal at the 2012 American Boxing Olympic Qualification Tournament in Rio de Janeiro, Brazil where he defeated Costa Rica's David Jimenez +14-14 and Peru's Enoc Hualinga 11-7 before losing to Puerto Rico's Jantony Ortiz in the semifinal round. He had an impressive amateur career finishing with a 135-15 record including 10 national championships.

== Professional boxing record ==
11 fights	7 wins	3 losses
By knockout	5	2
By decision	2	1
Draws	1	

No.	Result	Record	Opponent	Type	Round, time	Date	Location	Notes
11	Win	7-3–1	(United States) Gabriel Braxton	UD	4	Apr 6, 2018	(United States) Tyndall Armory, Indianapolis, Indiana, U.S.	
10	Loss	6-3–1	(Mexico) Hugo Hernandez Aguilar	TKO	3 (6), 2:16	Aug 19, 2017	Rosarito, Mexico	For vacant NABF junior light flyweight title
9	Win	6-2–1	(Mexico) Luis Daniel Sosa	TKO	1 (4), 1:31	July 1, 2017	Auditorio Municipal Jaltenco, Jaltenco, Mexico	
8	Loss	5–2–1	(Mexico) Cristian Vizcarra	UD	4	Apr 27, 2017	Escape Bar, Tijuana, Mexico	
7	Win	5–1–1	(Mexico) Jose Hernandez Cruz	UD	6	Mar 31, 2017	Plaza Pueblo Antiguo, Ensenada, Mexico	
6	Win	4–1–1	(Mexico) Alexis Quezada	TKO	3 (4), 0:59	Mar 24, 2017	Gimnasio Independencia, Tijuana, Mexico	
5	Win	3–1–1	(Mexico) Jose Galarza	KO	1 (4), 0:28	Jan 27, 2017	AS Boxing Arena, Tijuana, Mexico	
4	Loss	2–1–1	(Mexico) Miguel Hernandez	TKO	4 (4), 0:07	Apr 30, 2016	Billar El Perro Salado, Tijuana, Mexico	
3	Draw	2–0–1	(United States) Enrique Ayala	SD	4	Nov 30, 2013	(United States) Armadillo Flea Market, Houston, Texas, U.S.	
2	Win	2–0	(United States) Ricky Lacefield	TKO	1 (4), 1:51	May 11, 2013	(United States) Humble Civic Center Arena, Humble, Texas, U.S.	
1	Win	1–0	(United States) Joe Bush	KO	2 (4), 2:35	Apr 27, 2013	(United States) Grand Plaza Hotel, Toledo, Ohio, U.S.	
