= Prichard Colón =

Puerto Rican boxer (1992–2026)

- Colón after a match sometime before October 2015

Personal information
- Nickname: Digget
- Born: Prichard Colón Meléndez; September 19, 1992 Maitland, Florida, U.S.
- Died: August 13, 2026 (aged 33) Orlando, Florida, U.S.
- Resting place: Glen Haven Memorial Park, Winter Park, Florida
- Height: 6 ft 0 in (1.83 m)
- Weight: Super welterweight

Boxing career
- Reach: 74 in (190 cm)
- Stance: Orthodox

Boxing record
- Total fights: 17
- Wins: 16
- Win by KO: 13
- Losses: 1

Prichard Colón Meléndez (September 19, 1992 – August 13, 2026) was a Puerto Rican professional boxer, honorary WBC World Champion, and gold medal winner at the 2010 Pan American Youth Championship in the 64 kg (141 pounds) category. After a 2015 match with Terrel Williams, in which he was repeatedly struck in the back of the head with a rabbit punch, Colón collapsed in the dressing room and remained in a coma for 221 days due to a brain hemorrhage. He remained in a persistent vegetative state and was unable to speak, receiving physiotherapy until his death in 2026.

== Early years and amateur career ==
Prichard Colón Meléndez was born in Maitland, Florida, on September 19, 1992, the son of Richard Colón and Nieves Meléndez, a retired waitress. When he was 10, his father chose to relocate to Puerto Rico so Colón could compete for the island. He moved with his younger sister, while his mother and older brother stayed in Florida. They settled in the rural town of Orocovis.

Colón started his career at the Albergue Olímpico in Salinas, Puerto Rico, where he received the nickname "Digget", a play on "digger" tied to his height. After finishing high school, he studied business administration at the Universidad del Sagrado Corazón in San Juan.

As an amateur, Colón became known for winning five national titles in the 141- and 152-pound divisions. He also earned the gold medal at the 2010 Pan American Youth Championship in the 64 kg class. He competed at the Brazil Pre-Olympics for a chance to qualify for the 2012 Summer Olympics in London but lost in the third round to Venezuelan fighter Gabriel Maestre. In 2012, Colón turned professional and finished his amateur career with a 170–15 record.

== Professional career ==
Colón made his professional debut on February 23, 2013. His first fight was against Xavier La Salle at the Cosme Beitía Salamo Coliseum in Cataño, Puerto Rico. Colón knocked out LaSalle in the first round. He distinguished himself for his restless schedule, fighting five times in 2013 and seven times in 2014. His most notable fight came on September 9, 2015, when he fought Vivian Harris, a more experienced fighter. The fight was held at the Ricoh Coliseum in Toronto and ended with Colón knocking out Harris in the fourth round.

On October 17, 2015, Colón was slated to fight Terrel Williams in an undercard fight at the EagleBank Arena in Fairfax, Virginia. The fight was not originally part of the schedule but was added when Andre Dirrell withdrew from his fight with Blake Caparello for medical reasons. The bout occurred just one month after Colón's fight against Harris and marked the end of his professional career.

== Brain injury, retirement, and death ==
Colón and Terrel Williams fought for nine rounds. Throughout the match, Williams repeatedly rabbit punched Colón, despite the punch being illegal in all major combat sports, including boxing. During the bout, Colón repeatedly informed the referee, Joseph Cooper, about the illegal rabbit punches. Cooper dismissed him and said, "You take care of it." Colón then hit Williams with a low blow, for which he was penalized two points. After multiple rabbit punches, Colón was knocked down for the first time in his professional career during the ninth round. He spoke to the ringside doctor between rounds and said he felt dizzy but believed he could continue.

The ringside doctor, Richard Ashby, believed Colón would "shake it off" and cleared him, allowing the fight to continue. Colón was later disqualified via corner retirement after his corner mistakenly removed his gloves, thinking the fight had ended. His corner said he was incoherent and experiencing dizziness. Colón was assisted to the dressing room by his mother Nieves Colón, where he vomited and collapsed. He was taken to Inova Fairfax Hospital in Fairfax, Virginia by ambulance, where he was diagnosed with a left-sided subdural hematoma measuring 1.5 cm in diameter with 1.2 cm of midline shift. An emergency hemicraniectomy was performed to reduce brain swelling and evacuate the hematoma. As a result, Colón went into a coma for 221 days. He was treated for several weeks at Inova Fairfax Hospital, and was later transferred to Shepherd Center in Atlanta, Georgia. Colón was eventually moved to his mother's home in Orlando, Florida, where he lived for the rest of his life.

In 2017, Colón's parents filed a lawsuit seeking more than $50 million in damages from Richard Ashby and the organizers of the match. The lawsuit has not been settled as of 2025, and was never brought to trial. Prichard Colón's mother believes it may never be resolved. As of April 2017, Colón remained in a persistent vegetative state.

In a September 2017 interview, while discussing his role in Colón's injury, Williams refused any blame, saying:

I pray for Prichard every day. That's never going to change. I wish him nothing but peace and health ... I would never intentionally harm someone like that ... I don’t place any blame on myself. I prayed about it. I wish the young man really well. It's a hard situation on me and a hard situation on Colon's family.

In July 2018, Colón's mother posted a video on her Facebook account showing him taking physical therapy and responding to verbal commands. She also said he was learning to communicate through a computer. In 2023, his family, particularly his mother, continued to work with him while he remained in rehabilitation. He never recovered his speech ability.

On August 13, 2026, Colón's father announced that he had died earlier that day at the age of 33. He was interred at Glen Haven Memorial Park in Winter Park, Florida.

== Professional boxing record ==
17 fights	16 wins	1 loss
By knockout	13	0
By decision	3	0
By disqualification	0	1

No.	Result	Record	Opponent	Type	Round, time	Date	Location	Notes
17	Loss	16–1	(United States) Terrel Williams	DQ	9 (10), 0:17	Oct 17, 2015	(United States) EagleBank Arena, Fairfax, Virginia, U.S.	Colón down twice in round nine and lost two points for a low blow; DQ'd after his corner removed his gloves after round nine; Williams lost one point for rabbit punching, Colón suffered bleed to brain and later a coma.
16	Win	16–0	(Guyana) Vivian Harris	KO	4 (6), 1:03	Sep 11, 2015	Coca-Cola Coliseum, Toronto, Ontario, Canada	
15	Win	15–0	(United States) Michael Finney	TKO	2	Aug 1, 2015	(United States) Barclays Center, Brooklyn, New York, U.S.	
14	Win	14–0	(United States) Daniel Calzada	TKO		Apr 11, 2015	(United States) Barclays Center, Brooklyn, New York, U.S.	
13	Win	13–0	(United States) Héctor Muñoz	UD		Jan 31, 2015	(United States) 2300 Arena, Philadelphia, Pennsylvania, U.S.	
12	Win	12–0	(Mexico) Christopher Degollado	UD		Sep 11, 2014	(United States) Hard Rock Hotel and Casino, Las Vegas, Nevada, U.S.	
11	Win	11–0	(United States) Lenwood Dozier	UD		Aug 9, 2014	(United States) Barclays Center, Brooklyn, New York, U.S.	
10	Win	10–0	(Puerto Rico) Carlos García Hernández	TKO		Jun 19, 2014	Coliseo Rubén Rodríguez, Bayamón, Puerto Rico	
9	Win	9–0	(Puerto Rico) Javier García	TKO		Apr 28, 2014	Coliseo Rubén Rodríguez, Bayamón, Puerto Rico	
8	Win	8–0	(United States) Shad Howard	TKO		Mar 15, 2014	Coliseo Rubén Rodríguez, Bayamón, Puerto Rico	
7	Win	7–0	(Dominican Republic) José Vidal Soto	TKO		Jan 25, 2014	(Dominican Republic) Gimnasio Manuel Toribio, Jacagua	
6	Win	6–0	(Dominican Republic) Víctor Moya	TKO		Jan 19, 2014	Arena del Masacre, Loma de Cabrera, Dominican Republic	
5	Win	5–0	(Puerto Rico) Jonathan García	RTD		Dec 21, 2013	Coliseo Cosme Beitía Salamo, Cataño, Puerto Rico	
4	Win	4–0	(Dominican Republic) Juan Ramón Santos	TKO		Dec 7, 2013	Coliseo Pedro Julio Nolasco, La Romana, Dominican Republic	
3	Win	3–0	(Dominican Republic) Jorge Burgos	TKO		Nov 9, 2013	Coliseo Pedro Julio Nolasco, La Romana, Dominican Republic	
2	Win	2–0	(United States) Patrick Thomas	TKO		Mar 23, 2013	(United States) Bahia Shrine Temple, Orlando, Florida, U.S.	
1	Win	1–0	(Puerto Rico) Xavier Lasalle	KO		Feb 23, 2013	Coliseo Cosme Beitía Salamo, Cataño, Puerto Rico	

== See also ==
- List of deaths due to injuries sustained in boxing
