= Brody Blair =

Canadian boxer (born 1991)

Personal information
- Born: December 27, 1991 (age 34) New Glasgow, Nova Scotia
- Height: 170 cm (5 ft 7 in)
- Weight: Super Middleweight

Boxing career

Boxing record
- Total fights: 2
- Wins: 2
- Win by KO: 2
Medal record
Men's Boxing
Representing Canada
Pan American Games
Bronze medal – third place	2011 Guadalajara	Middleweight

Brody Blair (born December 27, 1991) is a Canadian professional boxer who has represented Canada in multiple international amateur competitions as a middleweight.

== 2011 Pan American Games ==
Born in New Glasgow, Nova Scotia, Blair won a bronze medal at the 2011 Pan American Games in the middleweight division. After receiving a bye in the first round, Blair defeated Mario Bernal of El Salvador in the quarterfinals 24–12 to advance to the medal round. In the semifinals Blair lost to eventual gold medalist Emilio Correa of Cuba 30–7.

== 2012 Olympic Qualification Attempt ==
At the 2012 American Boxing Olympic Qualification Tournament, Blair won two bouts to advance to the quarterfinals as a middleweight. In the quarterfinals he lost to Junior Castillo of Dominican Republic. Blair needed Castillo to win the tournament to advance to the Olympics, but Castillo lost in the finals.

== 2013 AIBA World Boxing Championships ==
At the 2013 AIBA World Boxing Championships in the middleweight division Blair defeated Sanjin-Pol Vrgoč of Croatia and Mahmoud Shabab of the Palestinian territories in the first two rounds 3–0 each before losing to Zoltán Harcsa of Hungary 3–0 in the third round.

Blair went on to represent Canada at the 2014 Commonwealth Games.

== Titles ==
- 2009 – Canadian Youth Champion
- 2011 – Canadian Senior Champion

== Professional career ==
Blair turned professional on May 27, 2017 in Fredericton, New Brunswick and won by TKO in the 2nd round. He won his second professional fight in November.

2 fights	2 wins	losses
By knockout	2	0
