= Juan Medina Herrad =

Dominican Republic boxer (born 1992)

Juan Medina
Personal information
- Full name: Juan Gabriel Medina Herrad
- Nationality: Dominican Republic
- Born: October 16, 1992 (age 33) La Romana, La Romana Province, Dominican Republic

Sport
- Sport: Boxing
- Weight class: Light flyweight
Medal record
Men's Boxing
Representing the Dominican Republic
World Combat Games
Bronze medal – third place	2010 Beijing	Boxing −49 kg
Pan American Games
Bronze medal – third place	2011 Guadalajara	Light flyweight

Juan Gabriel Medina Herrad (born 16 October 1992 in La Romana, La Romana) is a Dominican boxer who competes as a 48 kg light flyweight. He won the bronze medal at the 2010 World Combat Games and the 2011 Pan American Games.

== Early and personal life ==
Medina started boxing under the guidance of coach Severino Aquino at the age of 10. He is a military athlete in the Dominican Air Force, with the rank of private.

== Career ==
=== 2009 ===
He won the gold medal at the Pan American Junior Championship for under 15-16 held in Ecuador.

=== 2010 ===
Medina competed at the 2010 Youth World Amateur Boxing Championships, being defeated by Indian boxer Devendro Laishram 17–8 in his first fight. He also boxed in the 2010 World Combat Games in Beijing, China, where he won the bronze medal after losing to Zou Shiming of China. He represented La Romana at the 2010 Romana Cup, winning the gold medal in the 49 kg light flyweight category by defeating Luis Díaz of the Dominican Republic National Team.

=== 2011 ===
Medina boxed at Pan American Games Qualifier 1 in Cumaná, Venezuela, winning the gold medal and thus qualifying for the Pan American Games. At the games he lost to Joselito Velázquez in the semifinal to finish with the bronze medal in the light flyweight category.

In July 2011, Medina boxed at the 5th CISM Military World Games and was defeated by Indian Nanao Singh 20–18 in the preliminary round of the 49 kg category. At the Romana Cup, held in his hometown La Romana, he won the gold medal in the 46–49 kg category and was nominated Most Technical Boxer in the event. In the 2011 World Amateur Boxing Championships he lost 17–6 to Zou Shiming in the first round.

=== 2012 ===
Medina avenged his Pan American Games defeat against Velasquez in the quarterfinal of the Independence Cup and went on to win the gold medal in the −49 kg category, defeating Mexican Óscar Valdez. In March, Medina was runner-up to Dagoberto Agüero for the Dominican Republic Boxing Federation's Boxer of the Year award.

Medina was disqualified in his last-16 fight against Velázquez in the American Olympic Qualification Tournament. After being down 9–17 in the third round, Medina downed Velásquez with an illegal low punch, and the referee disqualified him.
