= Eddie Valenzuela =

Guatemalan boxer

Personal information
- Full name: Eddie Valenzuela Barillas
- Nationality: Guatemala
- Born: December 22, 1982 (age 43) Guatemala City, Guatemala
- Height: 5 ft 5 in (1.65 m)
- Weight: 51 kg (112 lb)

Sport
- Sport: Boxing
- Weight class: Flyweight

Eddie Valenzuela Barillas (born 22 December 1982) is a Guatemalan amateur boxer who qualified to the 2008 Olympic Games at flyweight.

Valenzuela, a native of Guatemala City, was the first Guatemalan boxer to reach the Olympics in 16 years. At the Beijing Games, he lost the only fight he contested, in the round of 32, against Thai boxer Somjit Jongjohor, who was the eventual gold medal winner.

In 2009 he reached the third round at the amateur world boxing championship in Milan Italy, ranking as one of the best 16 amateur boxers at the flyweight division. He also participated at the 2010 Central American and Caribbean Games and at the 2011 Pan American Games.
