= Wellington Arias =

Dominican boxer (born 1991)

Personal information
- Born: 31 March 1991 (age 35) Santo Domingo, Dominican Republic

Sport
- Sport: Boxing
Medal record
Representing Dominican Republic
Central American and Caribbean Games
Bronze medal – third place	2010 Mayaguez	Lightweight

Wellington Arias Romero (born March 13, 1991) is a Dominican amateur lightweight boxer who competed at the 2012 Summer Olympics.

== Career ==
At the 2010 Central American and Caribbean Games he won a bronze medal.

At the 2011 World Amateur Boxing Championships (results) he beat a Gambian and lost to Uzbek Fazliddin Gaibnazarov.

At the 2011 Pan American Games he lost his first bout to Brazilian Robson Conceição.

At the Olympic qualifier he defeated Venezuelan veteran Héctor Manzanilla, Luis Enrique Porozo (ECU) and Jose Ramírez (USA) to qualify, a final loss to Félix Verdejo was meaningless. At the Olympics he beat Colombian Eduar Marriaga then lost to favorite Vasyl Lomachenko 3:15.

Boxing Trainer: Aroz Terrific Gist, Strength and Conditioning Coach: Farrel Brenner
