= Rachid Azzedine =

French boxer

Rachid Azzedine is a French boxer. At the 2012 Summer Olympics, he competed in the Men's lightweight, but was defeated in the first round.
