= Juan Hiracheta =

Mexican boxer (born 1990)

Personal information
- Nationality: Mexican
- Born: Juan Isidro Hiracheta Martínez; 15 May 1990 (age 36) Monterrey, Nuevo León, Mexico
- Height: 1.90 m (6 ft 3 in)

Boxing career
- Stance: Orthodox
Medal record
Men's Boxing
Representing Mexico
Pan American Games
Silver medal – second place	2011 Guadalajara	Super Heavyweight

Juan Isidro Hiracheta Martínez (born 15 May 1990) is a Mexican amateur boxer who won a silver medal in the super heavyweight division during the 2011 Pan American Games.

Hiracheta upset Venezuelan José Payares and Colombian Isaías Mena but lost the final bout 13:20 to Italo Perea from Ecuador.
