= Mian Hussain =

Canadian boxer

- thumbnail

Personal information
- Nickname: Super
- Nationality: Pakistani Canadian
- Born: Mian Imtiaz Hussain; July 10, 1990 (age 35) Laval, Quebec

Sport
- Country: Canada
- Sport: Boxing
- Position: Southpaw
- Weight class: Welterweight
- Turned pro: 2012
Medal record
Men's Boxing
Representing Canada
Pan American Games
Bronze medal – third place	2011 Guadalajara	Welterweight
- Updated on 23 November 2013

Mian Hussain (born July 10, 1990) is a Canadian boxer who represented Canada at the 2011 Pan American Games as a welterweight. Hussain is now a professional boxer with a record of 16 wins (6 by KO), with only 2 defeats.
