= William Encarnación =

Dominican Republic boxer (born 1988)

William Encarnacion Alcantara (born 28 June 1988, San Juan de la Maguana) is a Dominican Republic boxer. At the 2012 Summer Olympics, he competed in the Men's bantamweight, but was defeated in the second round by Algerian Mohamed Ouadahi.
