= Juan Pablo Romero (boxer) =

Mexican boxer (born 1990)

Personal information
- Born: 30 January 1990 (age 36) Mexico City, Mexico

Sport
- Sport: Boxing
Medal record
Representing Mexico
Central American and Caribbean Games
Bronze medal – third place	2010 Mayaguez	Welterweight

Juan Pablo Romero (born January 30, 1990) is a Mexican boxer. He competed at the 2016 Summer Olympics in the men's welterweight event, in which he was eliminated in the round of 32 by Vincenzo Mangiacapre.
