= Jantony Ortiz =

Puerto Rican boxer (born 1994)

Personal information
- Nickname: Nenito
- Nationality: Puerto Rican
- Born: Jantony Ortiz Marcano; July 21, 1994 (age 31) Humacao, Puerto Rico
- Height: 5 ft 5 in (165 cm)
- Weight: Bantamweight

Boxing career
- Stance: Orthodox

Boxing record
- Total fights: 9
- Wins: 8
- Win by KO: 4
- Losses: 1
Medal record
Men's amateur boxing
Representing Puerto Rico
Pan American Games
Bronze medal – third place	2011 Guadalajara	Light flyweight

Jantony Ortiz Marcano (born July 21, 1994) is a Puerto Rican professional boxer in the bantamweight division. As an amateur he represented Puerto Rico at the 2012 Summer Olympics as a bantamweight.

== Amateur career ==
Considered a boxing prodigy, he became the youngest member in the history of the Puerto Rico national boxing team by winning the national championship at the age of 16. While still a youth competitor, Ortiz entered open class tournaments and became the bronze medallist at the 2011 Pan American Games. In May 2012, Ortiz qualified for the 2012 Summer Olympics by winning the gold medal at the 2012 American Boxing Olympic Qualification Tournament. During the olympics, he was defeated in the 'Round of 16' by former European champion David Ayrapetyan. The judges scored the first round 4-4, the second 5–3 in favor of Ayrapetyan, while the third round was scored a highly controversial 6-6.

Ortiz qualified to the 2013 AIBA World Boxing Championships, the first in over two decades to rely on the 10 point scoring system. In his opening fight, he defeated Severian Chiladze of Georgia by unanimous decision. To advance in the second round, Ortiz defeated the tenth seed of the tournament, Dominican Geraldo Pérez.

== Professional boxing record ==
8 fights	8 wins	0 losses
By knockout	4	0
By decision	4	0

No.	Result	Record	Opponent	Type	Round, time	Date	Location	Notes
9	Loss	8-1	(Puerto Rico) Abimael Ortiz	KO by	5 (8)	May 19, 2018	Parque Pedro Cepeda, Cataño, Puerto Rico	
8	Win	8–0	(Dominican Republic) Lucian González	UD	4	March 16, 2018	Casa de los Clubes, Santo Domingo, Dominican Republic	
7	Win	7–0	(Puerto Rico) Hayron Santiago	KO	1 (6), 0:00	Mar 25, 2017	Parque Concepción Pérez Alberto, Fajardo, Puerto Rico	
6	Win	6–0	(Dominican Republic) Geicy Lorenzo	UD	6	February 12, 2017	Casa de los Clubes, Santo Domingo, Dominican Republic	
5	Win	5–0	(Puerto Rico) Luis Cosme	TKO	3 (6), 2:59	Aug 8, 2015	Héctor Solá Bezares Coliseum, Caguas, Puerto Rico	
4	Win	4–0	(Puerto Rico) Jaxel Marrero	UD	4	Apr 4, 2015	Palacio de Recreación y Deportes, Mayagüez, Puerto Rico	
3	Win	3–0	(Mexico) Gilberto Mendoza	UD	4	Oct 4, 2014	(United States) Bahia Shriner Temple, Orlando, Florida, U.S.	
2	Win	2–0	(Puerto Rico) Edwin Rosario	KO	1 (4), 0:22	Jul 11, 2014	Emilio Huyke Coliseum, Humacao, Puerto Rico	
1	Win	1–0	(United States) Elio David Ruíz	KO	1 (4), 1:51	Jun 7, 2014	(United States) Madison Square Garden, New York, U.S.	Professional debut
