= José Espinoza (boxer) =

Venezuelan boxer (born 1988)

José Espinoza (born 15 June 1988, San José de Rio Chico, Miranda) is a Venezuelan boxer who competes as a middleweight. At the 2012 Summer Olympics he was defeated in the heats of the men's middleweight by Zoltán Harcsa.
