= Anderson Rojas =

Ecuadorian boxer

Anderson Rojas is an amateur boxer from Ecuador who has qualified for the 2012 Olympics as a light welterweight.

Anderson was a quarter-finalist and 5th-place finisher at middleweight at the 2012 American Boxing Olympic Qualification Tournament. Five spots were available for qualification at light welterweight and Anderson qualified over the other quarter-finalists since his loss was to the eventual winner Roniel Iglesias. Qualification being dependent on how the opponent performed in later rounds was controversial and will not be used in future Olympics.

Anderson also won a gold medal at the South American Championships and a silver medal at the Panamerican Youth Championships.
