= Valentino Knowles =

Bahamian boxer

Personal information
- Nationality: Bahamian
- Born: 16 August 1988 (age 37)

Boxing career

Boxing record
- Total fights: 2
- Wins: 2
Medal record
Men's Boxing
Representing Bahamas
Central American and Caribbean Games
Gold medal – first place	2010 Mayagüez	Light welterweight
Pan American Games
Silver medal – second place	2011 Guadalajara	Light welterweight
Commonwealth Games
Bronze medal – third place	2010 Delhi	Light welterweight

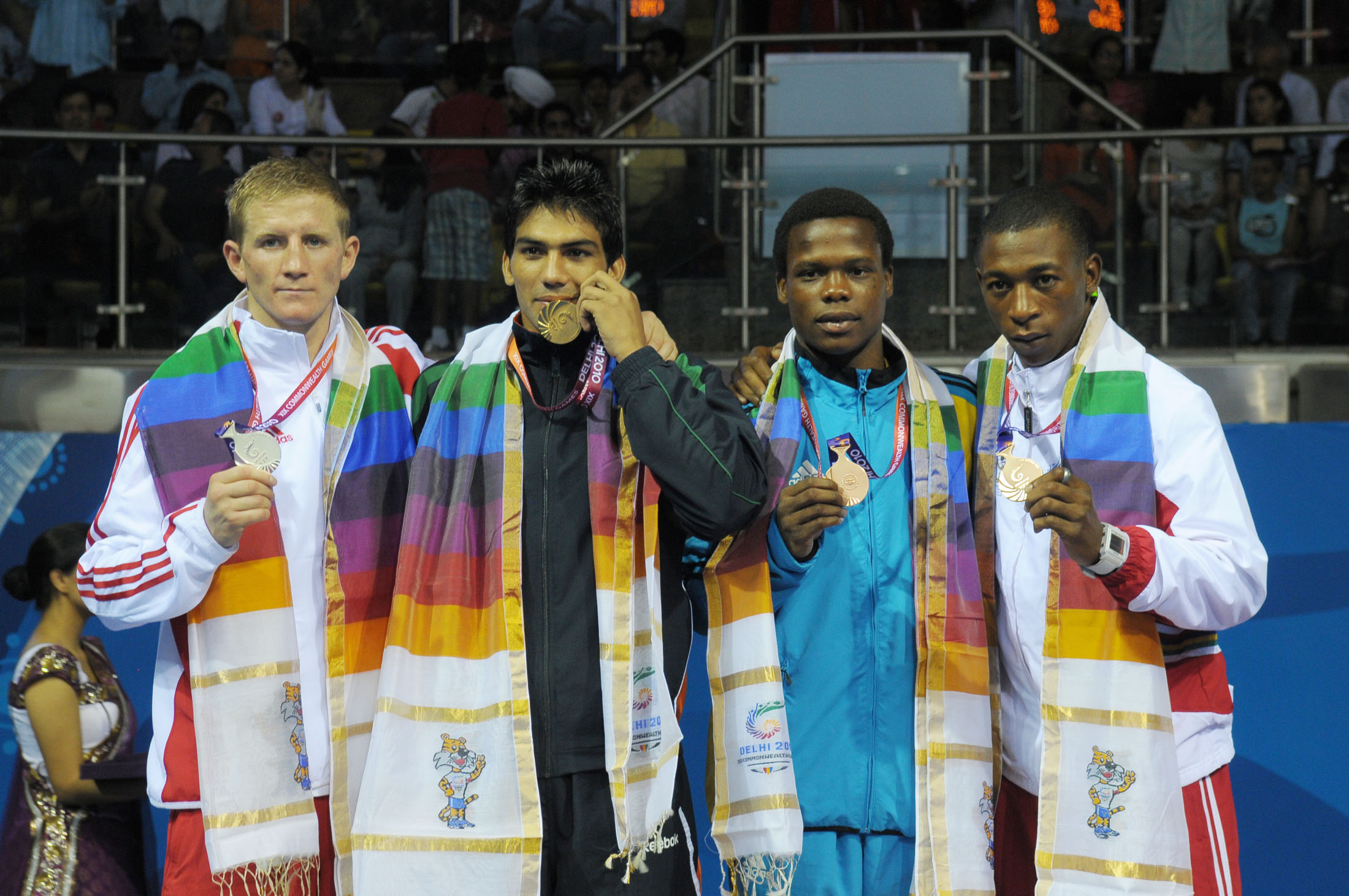
XIX Commonwealth Games-2010 Delhi Winners of Light Welter Weight (64 kg) Boxing Event: Valentino Knowles (Bronze), third from left

Valentino Knowles (born 16 August 1988) is a Bahamian former professional boxer.

== Career ==
As an amateur, Knowles represented the Bahamas across various international competitions in the light welterweight division. His best performances include a gold medal at the 2010 Central American and Caribbean Games, a silver medal at the 2011 Pan American Games and a bronze medal at the 2010 Commonwealth Games. He also competed at the AIBA World Boxing Championships in 2009 and 2011.

Knowles missed qualification for the 2012 Summer Olympics and soon after turned professional. He fought two professional bouts in 2013, both wins, over Ruben Ozuna and Alejandro Ochoa. During this time he trained in Miami, under Orlando Cuellar.

== Shooting ==
His career was ended by a shooting in 2014, outside an apartment complex in the Kemp Road area of Nassau. Shots were fired at Knowles and three other pedestrians from a vehicle which had pulled up, with the boxer struck multiple times. Knowles was shot in the leg, upper right chest, chin and twice in his left hand. He was sent to hospital in a serious condition but doctors were able to save his life. His leg was broken in three places and he suffered a fractured jaw.

He is now a certified international amateur boxing coach.
