= Juan Carlos Rodríguez (boxer) =

Venezuelan boxer

Personal information
- Full name: Juan Carlos Rodríguez Patiño
- Born: August 14, 1990 (age 35) Cumaná, Venezuela

Sport
- Sport: Boxing
Medal record
Men's amateur boxing
Representing Venezuela
Pan American Games
Bronze medal – third place	2011 Guadalajara	Middleweight

Juan Carlos Rodríguez Patiño (born August 14, 1990) is a Venezuelan professional boxer. As an amateur, he won a bronze medal at the 2011 Pan American Games. He was considered a top amateur boxer at middleweight in Venezuela.

== Amateur career ==
In 2011 Rodríguez won a silver medal in the first Pan American Games Qualifier at middleweight. He was defeated by the score of 10–4 by Cuban Emilio Correa, who won the silver medal at the Beijing 2008 Olympic Games. At the 2011 Pan American Games held in Mexico, Rodríguez won the middleweight bronze medal.
