= Enrique Collazo =

Puerto Rican boxer (born 1988)

Medal record

Men's amateur boxing

Representing Puerto Rico

Central American and Caribbean Games
Gold medal – first place	2010 Mayaguez	Middleweight

Enrique "Kikin" Collazo (born 5 October 1988 in Adjuntas) is a professional boxer from Puerto Rico who competed in the 2012 Olympics as a middleweight (75 kg).

Enrique was a quarter-finalist and 5th-place finisher at middleweight at the 2012 American Boxing Olympic Qualification Tournament. Five spots were available for qualification at middleweight and Enrique qualified over the other quarter-finalists since his loss was to the eventual winner Terrell Gausha. Qualification being dependent on how the opponent performed in later rounds was controversial and will not be used in future Olympics.

Enrique won the gold medal at the 2010 Central American and Caribbean Games.

At the 2012 Summer Olympics, Collazo was defeated in the first round by the Germany's Stefan Hartel with a score of 18-10.
