= Karlha Magliocco =

Venezuelan boxer

Karlha Francesca Magliocco
Personal information
- Nationality: Venezuela
- Born: 8 March 1986 (age 40) Ciudad Bolívar, Venezuela
- Height: 5 ft 2 in (157 cm)
- Weight: Flyweight

Boxing career
Medal record
Women's boxing
Representing Venezuela
Pan American Games
Bronze medal – third place	2011 Mexico	Women's Flyweight

Karlha Francesca Magliocco is a Venezuelan amateur boxer. She was born in Ciudad Bolívar, Venezuela

She represented Venezuela in the 2012 Summer Olympics in the Flyweight division. She lost in the quarter-finals to Marlen Esparza of USA 16-24.

== Achievements ==
- 2012 – Batalla de Carabobo Women's Tournament (Valencia, VEN) 1st place – 51 kg
- 2011 – Panamerican Games (Guadalajara, MEX) 3rd place – 51 kg
- 2010 – Panamerican Women’s Championships (Brasília, BRA) 1st place – 48 kg
- 2011 – Batalla de Carabobo Tournament (Valencia, VEN) 1st place – 51 kg
- 2011 – 1st Panamerican Games Qualification Tournament (Cumana, VEN) 2nd place – 51 kg
- 2010 – Venezuelan Women’s National Championships 1st place – 48 kg
