= Braulio Ávila =

Mexican boxer

Personal information
- Full name: Braulio Ávila Juárez
- Born: March 5, 1986 (age 40) Chiautempan, Tlaxcala

Sport
- Sport: Boxing
Medal record
Men's amateur boxing
Representing Mexico
Central American and Caribbean Games
Bronze medal – third place	2006 Cartagena	Flyweight
Bronze medal – third place	2010 Mayagüez	Flyweight
Pan American Games
Bronze medal – third place	2007 Rio de Janeiro	Flyweight
Bronze medal – third place	2011 Guadalajara	Flyweight

Braulio Ávila Juárez (born March 5, 1986, in Chiautempan, Tlaxcala) is a Mexican amateur boxer best known for winning bronze medals in flyweight at the 2006 Central American and Caribbean Games and both 2007 and 2011 Pan American Games.

== Career ==
At the 2006 Central American and Caribbean Games the pressure fighter won bronze when he lost to Yoandri Salinas 6:9.

He easily qualified for the PanAm Games even though he lost the final of his qualifier to Yoandri Salinas, at the main event he lost to Juan Carlos Payano 4:20 in the semis and won bronze.

At the 2007 World Championships he reached the second round by beating Jackson Chauke but lost to eventual winner Rau'shee Warren
