= Boxing at the 2010 Central American and Caribbean Games =

Boxing competitions

- Venue: Coliseo Rafael A. Mangual
- Location: Mayaguez
- Dates: 23–31 July

The Boxing competition at the 2010 Central American and Caribbean Games was held in Mayagüez, Puerto Rico. The tournament was scheduled from 23–31 July at the Coliseo Rafael A. Mangual in Mayagüez.

== Medal summary ==
=== Men's events ===
Event	Gold	Silver	Bronze
Light −Fly 48kg	Ángel Acosta (PUR)	Alvaro Vargas (GUA)	David Jimenez (CRC); Gilberto Pedroza (PAN)
Fly −51kg	Jonathan Gonzalez (PUR)	Ceiber Ávila (COL)	Braulio Avila (MEX); Dexter Jordan (GUY)
Bantam −54kg	Camilo Pérez (PUR)	Oscar Negrete (COL)	Alexander Espinoza (NCA); Jorge Nuñez (DOM)
Feather 56kg	Oscar Valdez (MEX)	Juan Reyes (GUA)	Roberto Navarro (DOM); Ray Sandiford (GUY)
Light −60kg	José Pedraza (PUR)	César Villarraga (COL)	Joselito Aguirre (GUA); Wellintong Arias (DOM)
Light Welter −64kg	Valentino Knowles (BAH)	Luis Romero (VEN)	Ricardo Garcia Tejada (DOM); Juan Pablo Romero (MEX)
Welter −69kg	Christian Peguero (PUR)	Oscar Molina (MEX)	Juan Carlos Abreu (DOM); Aaron Prince (TRI)
Middle −75kg	Enrique Collazo (PUR)	Felix Valera (DOM)	Jose Bernal (ESA); Jovan Young (JAM)
Light Heavy −81kg	Jeysson Monroy (COL)	Andrew Fermin (TRI)	Israel Duffus (PAN); Francisco Ortega (MEX)
Heavy −91kg	Deivi Julio (COL)	Joel Cabrera (DOM)	Anderson Emmanuel (BAR); Ismael Lewitt (NCA)
Super Heavy +91kg	Gerardo Bisbal (PUR)	Gilton Zimmerman (AHO)	Tariq Abdul Haqq (TRI); José Payares (VEN)
