= Juan Huertas =

Panamanian boxer

Juan Huertas Garcia is a Panamanian boxer. At the 2012 Summer Olympics, he competed in the men's lightweight, but was defeated in the first round against Puerto Rican Félix Verdejo.
