= Ceiber Ávila =

Colombian boxer (born 1989)

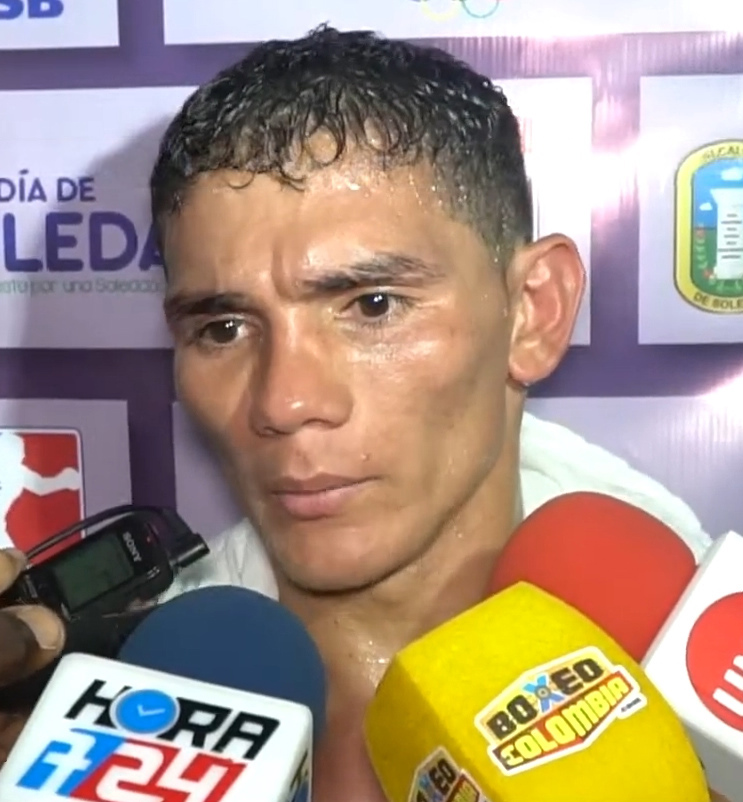
- Ávila in 2018

Personal information
- Full name: Ceiber David Ávila Segura
- Born: 26 May 1989 (age 37)

Sport
- Sport: Boxing
- Weight class: Flyweight
Medal record
Representing Colombia
Men's amateur boxing
Pan American Games
Bronze medal – third place	2015 Toronto	Flyweight
Central American and Caribbean Games
Gold medal – first place	2018 Barranquilla	Flyweight
Silver medal – second place	2010 Mayagüez	Flyweight
South American Games
Silver medal – second place	2018 Cochabamba	Flyweight

Ceiber David Ávila Segura (born 26 May 1989) is a Colombian boxer. He competed in the men's flyweight event at the 2016 Summer Olympics. In June 2021, he qualified to represent Colombia at the 2020 Summer Olympics. In the 2018 Central American and Caribbean Games, he won the gold medal.
