= Gerardo Bisbal =

Puerto Rican boxer

Gerardo Bisbal Melero
Personal information
- Nickname: Bisbal
- Nationality: Puerto Rican
- Born: Gerardo Miguel Bisbal Melero; 11 September 1984 (age 41) Salinas, Puerto Rico
- Weight: Heavyweight

Boxing career
- Stance: Orthodox

Boxing record
- Total fights: 104 amateur bouts
- Wins: 85
- Losses: 19
Medal record
Representing Puerto Rico
Men's Boxing
Pan American Games
Bronze medal – third place	2011 Guadalajara	Super Heavyweight
Central American and Caribbean Games
Gold medal – first place	2010 Mayagüez	Super Heavyweight
Bronze medal – third place	2006 Cartagena	Super Heavyweight
Bronze medal – third place	2002 San Salvador	Light Heavyweight

Gerardo Miguel Bisbal Melero (born 11 September 1984 in Ponce, Puerto Rico) is a heavyweight boxer from Puerto Rico. He is best known for having been the first Puerto Rican boxer to win medals in three Central American and Caribbean Games. He also won for first time in Puerto Rico boxing history a gold medal in the Super Heavyweight division. His brother Victor Bisbal was gold medallist in heavyweight in 2002, since 1954 no Puerto Rican had won gold medal in heavyweight.

== Personal life ==
Gerardo Bisbal began in boxing at 14 years old and was the national champion in 2001. He fought at 81 kg, 91 kg and +91 kg divisions. Gerardo is married to Yahaira Santiago, the couple has one son, Evan Leonardo and one daughter, Gerardine Arielis. He has two brothers, Ricardo and Victor, and one sister, Mayela, His elder brother Victor Bisbal is a former amateur boxer and a pro boxer, who was the gold medallist in 2002 in 91 kg, at the Central American and Caribbean Games and the bronze medallist in +91 kg at the 2003 Pan American Games. Gerardo was introduced to boxing by his brother Victor.

Like his father before him, Bisbal is a professional mechanic. Since the mid 2010s, he has operated a workshop at Salinas along his brother.

== Amateur career ==
Participated at 17 years old in 2002 Central American and Caribbean Games, San Salvador, El Salvador results were: 81 kg won bronze medal

- lost against Shawn Terry Cox (BRB) RSCO 3 semifinal

Participated at 18 years old in 2003 Pan American Games, Santo Domingo, Republica Dominicana results were: 91 kg

- lost against Odlanier Solís (CUB) RSCH 2

Participated in the 2006 Central American and Caribbean Games, Cartagena, Colombia results were: +91 kg won bronze medal

- won against Enoch Romero (TRI) 16-6 quarterfinal
- lost against Michel López Núñez (CUB) 13-2 semifinal

Participated in 2007 Pan American Games, Rio de Janeiro, Brazil results were: +91 kg

- lost against Óscar Rivas (COL) 22-8

Participated in 2010 Central American and Caribbean Games, Mayagüez, Puerto Rico results were: +91 kg won gold medal

- won against Manuel de Jesus (DOM) 7-5 quarterfinal
- won against José Payares (VEN) 11-11 (24-24) by jury 5-0 semifinal
- won against Gilton Benjey Zimmerman (AHO) 9-3 final

Participated in 2011 Pan American Games Guadalajara, Mexico results were: +91 kg won bronze medal

- won against Clayton Laurent, Jr. (ISV) 20-11 quarterfinal
- lost against Ítalo Perea (ECU) ko 2 semifinal
