= Andrew Fermin =

Trinidad and Tobago boxer (born 1984)

Personal information
- Nationality: Trinidad and Tobago
- Born: 14 December 1984 (age 41)
- Weight: Light heavyweight

Boxing career
Medal record
Central American and Caribbean Games
Silver medal – second place	2006 Cartagena	Middleweight
Silver medal – second place	2010 Mayaguez	Middleweight

Andrew Fermin (born 14 December 1984) is a Trinidad and Tobago boxer who has won silver medals at the Central American and Caribbean Games; in the Middleweight division in 2006 and in the Light heavyweight division in 2010. In 2007 he qualified for the Pan American Games but lost to Alfonso Blanco in the quarter finals.He was Coached by Reynold Cox
