= Ítalo Perea =

Ecuadorian boxer (born 1993)

Personal information
- Born: 10 June 1993 (age 33) Esmeraldas, Ecuador

Sport
- Sport: Boxing
Medal record
Men's boxing
Representing Ecuador
Pan American Games
Gold medal – first place	2011 Guadalajara	Super heavyweight

Ítalo Perea Castillo (alternatively spelled Ytalo; born June 10, 1993) is an Ecuadorian professional boxer. He sensationally won the 2011 Pan American Games Super Heavyweight title at the age of 18. He is a lefthander but fights from an orthodox stance behind a tight guard.

In 2009, he controversially lost the 81 kg final of the World Junior (f. Cadet) Championships in Armenia to Uzbek Kharzanov.

In 2010, he won the 81 kg PanAm Junior title.

In 2011, he moved up two classes to Super Heavy where he benefitted from the absence of Cuban top favorite Erislandy Savón and won the senior PanAm title by KOing Gerardo Bisbal and outpointing Juan Hiracheta.

In 2012, he knocked out Simon Kean and defeated Dominic Breazeale to qualify for the Olympics. In London he ran right into defending champion Roberto Cammarelle and lost 10:18.

== Professional boxing record ==
18 fights	11 wins	5 losses
By knockout	7	1
By decision	4	4
Draws	2	

No.	Result	Record	Opponent	Type	Round, time	Date	Location	Notes
18	Loss	11–5–2	Martin Bakole	TKO	1 (8), 1:20	Aug 2, 2019	Exhibition Centre, Liverpool, England	
17	Loss	11–4–2	Tyrone Spong	SD	10	Dec 21, 2018	Anthony Nesty sporthal, Paramaribo, Suriname	For WBC Latino and WBO Latino heavyweight titles
16	Win	11–3–2	Darwin Arboleda	TKO	3 (8), 0:21	May 19, 2018	Gimnasio Guayaquil, Guayaquil, Ecuador	
15	Loss	10–3–2	Guillermo Jones	SD	11	Nov 18, 2017	Hotel Jaragua, Santo Domingo, Dominican Republic	For vacant WBA Fedelatin heavyweight title
14	Win	10–2–2	Jinner Guerrero	KO	4 (10), 0:29	Oct 28, 2017	Coliseo Federación, Milagro, Ecuador	
13	Win	9–2–2	Eliecer Castillo	UD	6	Jun 9, 2017	La Scala, Miami, Florida, U.S.	
12	Win	8–2–2	Jeyson Pabon	TKO	4 (8)	Jan 11, 2017	Coliseo River Oeste, Guayaquil, Ecuador	
11	Win	7–2–2	Jhan Carlo Delgado	UD	8	Dec 30, 2016	Coliseo River Oeste, Guayaquil, Ecuador	
10	Draw	6–2–2	Joey Dawejko	SD	8	Mar 5, 2016	Sands Bethlehem Event Center, Bethlehem, Pennsylvania, U.S.	
9	Loss	6–2–1	Adam Kownacki	UD	8	May 29, 2015	Barclays Center, Brooklyn, New York, U.S.	
8	Draw	6–1–1	Emilio Salas	SD	4	Jan 22, 2015	Webster Hall, Manhattan, New York, U.S.	
7	Win	6–1	Oswaldo Sánchez	KO	2 (6), 1:46	Apr 26, 2014	Guayaquil, Ecuador	
6	Win	5–1	Evan Nedd	UD	4	Sep 21, 2013	Resorts World Casino, Queens, New York, U.S.	
5	Loss	4–1	Avery Gibson	UD	6	Aug 24, 2013	Churchill County Fairgrounds, Fallon, Nevada, U.S.	
4	Win	4–0	John Orr	TKO	1 (4), 1:48	Jul 24, 2014	Roseland Ballroom, New York City, New York, U.S.	
3	Win	3–0	Glenn Thomas	UD	4	May 25, 2013	Rostraver Ice Garden, Belle Vernon, Pennsylvania, U.S.	
2	Win	2–0	Cornelius Gibbs	TKO	1 (4), 0:41	Apr 20, 2013	2XSalt Ministry Center, Charlotte, North Carolina, U.S.	
1	Win	1–0	Chris Gordon	KO	1 (4), 1:27	Mar 23, 2013	Frederick Fight Club, Frederick, Maryland, U.S.	
