= Óscar Molina =

American boxer (born 1990)

Personal information
- Full name: Óscar Molina Casillas
- Born: January 2, 1990 (age 36) Commerce, California, U.S.

Sport
- Sport: Boxing
Medal record
Men's amateur boxing
Representing Mexico
Youth World Championships
Gold medal – first place	2008 Guadalajara	Welterweight
Central American and Caribbean Games
Silver medal – second place	2010 Mayagüez	Welterweight
Pan American Games
Silver medal – second place	2011 Guadalajara	Welterweight

Óscar Molina Casillas (born January 2, 1990) is a former American amateur and professional boxer who qualified for the 2012 Summer Olympics, representing Mexico. His twin brother, Javier, competed for the USA at the 2008 Summer Olympics.

== Career ==
Molina was born in Commerce, California, a suburb 6 miles (9.7 km) east of Los Angeles.

He participated at the 2008 Youth World Amateur Boxing Championships in Guadalajara, Mexico where he obtained the gold medal. At the 2010 Central American and Caribbean Games he won the silver medal losing the final to local Christian Peguero. Later he achieved the silver medal at the 2011 Pan American Games held in Mexico when he lost to Cuban Carlos Banteux.

In May 2012, he qualified for the London 2012 Summer Olympics after winning the silver medal at the Rio Pre-Olympic tournament where he lost to local Myke Carvalho. In London, he lost in the first round to Custio Clayton of Canada.

== Professional career ==
Molina turned professional in January 2013, winning a unanimous decision over Hector Mendoza. He amassed a record of 13-2-1, but has not fought since 2017, suffering two consecutive defeats to Jarrett Hurd and Levan Ghvamichava.
