= Eduar Marriaga =

Colombian boxer

Eduar Marriaga Campo is a Colombian boxer. At the 2012 Summer Olympics, he competed in the Men's lightweight, but was defeated in the first round.
