= Myke Carvalho =

Brazilian boxer (born 1983)

Personal information
- Full name: Myke Michel de Carvalho
- Born: October 28, 1983 (age 42) Belém, Pará, Brazil

Sport
- Sport: Boxing
Medal record
Men's amateur boxing
Representing Brazil
Pan American Games
Bronze medal – third place	2007 Rio	Light Welterweight
Bronze medal – third place	2011 Guadalajara	Welterweight
South American Games
Gold medal – first place	2006 Buenos Aires	Light Welterweight
Gold medal – first place	2010 Medellin	Light Welterweight
Silver medal – second place	2002 Belém	Featherweight
Military World Games
Bronze medal – third place	2011 Rio de Janeiro	Light Welterweight

Myke Michel de Carvalho (born October 28, 1983, in Belém do Pará) is a Brazilian retired amateur boxer, best known for his participation in the 2004, 2008 and 2012 Summer Olympics and for winning bronze medals at the Panamerican Games in 2007 and 2011.

== Career ==
Carvalho stems from a boxing family, his uncle Dalgírio was a professional boxer. He started working out at the age of 11 and had his first amateur bout at 15.

He won silver at the South American Games 2002 at featherweight losing to Nehomar Cermeno.

He qualified for the 2004 Summer Olympics by ending up in first place at the 2nd AIBA American 2004 Olympic Qualifying Tournament in Rio de Janeiro, Brazil. At age 21 Carvalho lost at the Olympics 2004 in the men's lightweight division to Alex de Jesús of Puerto Rico, 24:39.

Now at junior welter he won the 2006 South American Games.

At the PanAm Games 2007 he lost at junior welter 8:9 to eventual winner Karl Dargan in the semis and settled for bronze.

At his 2008 Olympic qualifier he lost his semifinal to Manuel Félix Díaz but edged out Gumersindo Carrasco in the all-important third-place bout 3:2 to qualify. At the Olympics he was upset by Mauritian Richarno Colin, see here.

He won a gold at the 2010 South American Games at Junior Welter, and a bronze at the 2011 Military World Games.

At the 2011 Pan American Games he competed at Welter and won another Bronze after losing to Carlos Banteux.

At the 2012 American Boxing Olympic Qualification Tournament he beat Oscar Molina and qualified for his third Olympics in 2012, where he lost to Errol Spence.

Carvalho wished to achieve a fourth Olympic appearance at the 2016 Summer Olympics in Rio de Janeiro, but a forearm injury one month before the qualifiers forced his retirement at the age of 33. He now takes care of a gym at his hometown of Belém.
