= Francisco Vargas Ramirez =

Puerto Rican boxer

Francisco Vargas Ramirez is a Puerto Rican boxer. At the 2012 Summer Olympics, he competed in the Men's light welterweight, but was defeated in the first round.
