= Carlos Sánchez (boxer) =

Ecuadorian boxer

Personal information
- Born: 25 July 1988 (age 36); Loja, Ecuador

Sport
- Sport: Boxing

Carlos Sánchez (born 25 July 1988) is an Ecuadorian boxer. He competed in the 2011 Pan American Games and in the Men's welterweight event at the 2012 Summer Olympics but lost to Irish Adam Nolan in the first round.
