= Junior Castillo =

Dominican Republic boxer (born 1986)

Personal information
- Born: 10 May 1986 (age 39); Higüey, Dominican Republic

Sport
- Sport: Boxing

Junior Castillo (born May 10, 1986) is a Dominican Republic boxer who competes as a middleweight. At the 2012 Summer Olympics he was defeated in the heats of the Men's middleweight by Anthony Ogogo.
