= Julião Neto =

Brazilian boxer (born 1981)

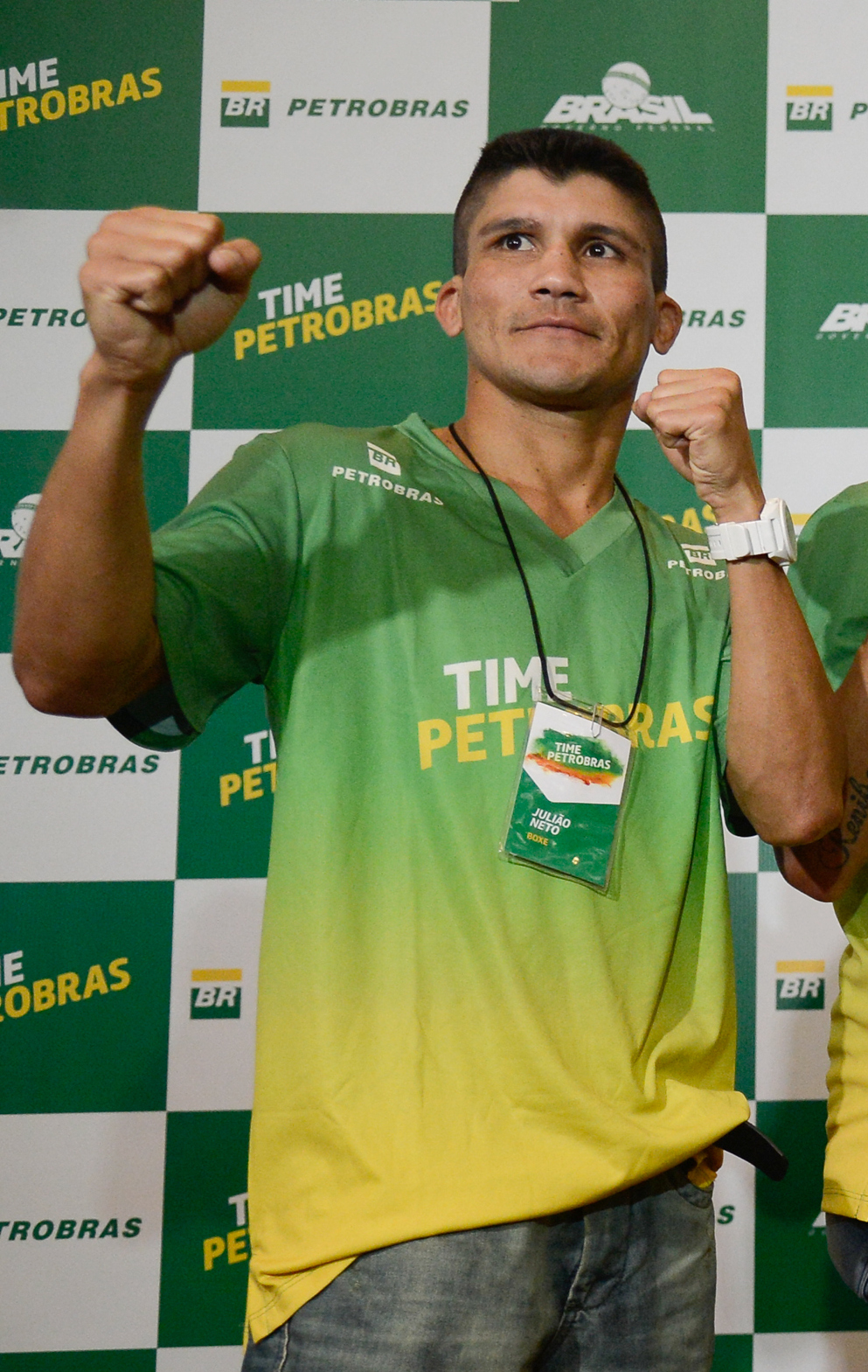
- Neto in 2016

Personal information
- Full name: Julião de Miranda Henriques Neto
- Born: 16 August 1981 (age 44) Igarapé-Miri, Pará, Brazil
- Height: 165 cm (5 ft 5 in)

Sport
- Sport: Boxing
- Club: Academia Rocky Balboa
- Coached by: Juraci de Oliveira
Medal record
Men's amateur boxing
Representing Brazil
South American Games
Silver medal – second place	2010 Medellín	-51 kg
Pan American Games
Bronze medal – third place	2011 Guadalajara	Flyweight

Julião de Miranda Henriques Neto (born 16 August 1981) is an amateur Brazilian flyweight boxer who won a silver medal at the 2010 South American Games. He competed at the 2012 Summer Olympics and the 2016 Summer Olympics.
