= 2012 European Boxing Olympic Qualification Tournament =

Boxing competitions

The 2012 European Boxing Olympic Qualification Tournament was held in Trabzon, Turkey from April 15 to April 21.

== Qualified athletes ==
Weight	1st	2nd	3rd	4th
Light flyweight (49kg)	Ferhat Pehlivan (TUR)	Aleksandar Aleksandrov (BUL)	Paddy Barnes (IRL)	Manuel Cappai (ITA)
Flyweight (52kg)	Nordine Oubaali (FRA)	Selçuk Eker (TUR)	Salomo Ntuve (SWE)	
Bantamweight (56kg)	Pavlo Ishchenko (UKR)	Magomed Abdulhamidov (AZE)	Dennis Ceylan (DEN)	Merab Turkadze (GEO)
Lightweight (60kg)	Evaldas Petrauskas (LTU)	Vazgen Safaryants (BLR)	Fatih Keleş (TUR)	Josh Taylor (GBR)
Light welterweight (64kg)	Yakup Şener (TUR)			
Welterweight (69kg)	Adam Nolan (IRL)	Patrick Wojcicki (GER)		
Middleweight (75kg)	Adem Kılıççı (TUR)	Anthony Ogogo (GBR)		
Light heavyweight (81kg)	Bahram Muzaffer (TUR)	Vatan Huseynli (AZE)	Mikhail Dauhaliavets (BLR)	
Heavyweight (91kg)	Tervel Pulev (BUL)			
Super heavyweight (+91kg)	Magomed Omarov (RUS)	Tony Yoka (FRA)		

== Qualification summary ==
NOC	49	52	56	60	64	69	75	81	91	+91	Total
Azerbaijan			X					X			2
Belarus				X				X			2
Bulgaria	X								X		2
Denmark			X								1
France		X								X	2
Georgia			X								1
Germany						X					1
Great Britain				X			X				2
Ireland	X					X					2
Italy	X										1
Lithuania				X							1
Russia										X	1
Sweden		X									1
Turkey	X	X		X	X		X	X			6
Ukraine			X								1
Total: 15 NOCs	4	3	4	4	1	2	2	3	1	2	26

== Results ==
=== Light flyweight ===
Round of 32 – April 15
	Score	
Aleksandar Aleksandrov (BUL)	17–7	David Albrdian (ISR)

Round of 16; April 17
Ferhat Pehlivan (TUR)	24
Denys Shkarubo (UKR)	7
Hamza Touba (GER)	16
Salman Alizada (AZE)	8
Vadzim Kirylenka (BLR)	9
Ştefan Caşlarov (ROU)	13
Paddy Barnes (IRL)	RSC
István Ungvári (HUN)
Manuel Cappai (ITA)	13
Koryum Soghomonyan (ARM)	10
Mikheil Kazanjiani (GEO)	RET
Łukasz Maszczyk (POL)
Valeriu Cîrma (MDA)	RSC
Kirill Serikov (EST)
Charlie Edwards (GBR)	12
Aleksandar Aleksandrov (BUL)	17

Quarterfinals; April 18
Ferhat Pehlivan (TUR)	15
Hamza Touba (GER)	7
Ştefan Caşlarov (ROU)	9
Paddy Barnes (IRL)	17
Manuel Cappai (ITA)	19
Łukasz Maszczyk (POL)	8
Valeriu Cîrma (MDA)	4
Aleksandar Aleksandrov (BUL)	12

Semifinals; April 20
Ferhat Pehlivan (TUR)	21
Paddy Barnes (IRL)	14
Manuel Cappai (ITA)	5
Aleksandar Aleksandrov (BUL)	9

Final; April 21
Ferhat Pehlivan (TUR)	10
Aleksandar Aleksandrov (BUL)	9

=== Flyweight ===
Round of 16; April 17
Salomo Ntuve (SWE)	12
Pedro Matos (POR)	7
Miloš Baltić (SRB)	10
Oleksandr Shepeliuk (UKR)	15
Stefan Ivanov (BUL)	18
Taulant Zajmi (ALB)	9
Nordine Oubaali (FRA)	19
Alexandru Rîşcan (MDA)	8
Rafał Kaczor (POL)	23
Dzmitry Stryhelski (BLR)	12
Hovhannes Danielyan (ARM)	9
Selçuk Eker (TUR)	23
Francisco Torrijos (ESP)	13
Norbert Kalucza (HUN)	21
Ronny Beblik (GER)	13
Severiane Chiladze (GEO)	16

Quarterfinals; April 18
Salomo Ntuve (SWE)	14
Oleksandr Shepeliuk (UKR)	9
Stefan Ivanov (BUL)	9
Nordine Oubaali (FRA)	18
Rafał Kaczor (POL)	13
Selçuk Eker (TUR)	18
Norbert Kalucza (HUN)	14
Severiane Chiladze (GEO)	13

Semifinals; April 20
Salomo Ntuve (SWE)	10
Nordine Oubaali (FRA)	11
Selçuk Eker (TUR)	22
Norbert Kalucza (HUN)	12

Final; April 21
Nordine Oubaali (FRA)	20
Selçuk Eker (TUR)	10

=== Bantamweight ===
Round of 32 – April 15
	Score	
Anthony Bret (FRA)	14–12	Mehmet Topçakan (TUR)
Orestes Molina (ESP)	12–26	Dennis Ceylan (DEN)
Aram Avagyan (ARM)	8–15	Pavlo Ishchenko (UKR)
Vanja Bačić (SRB)	5–14	Veaceslav Gojan (MDA)
Matti Koota (FIN)	11–4	Mirsad Ahmeti (CRO)
Bashir Hassan (SWE)	13–6	Dmitrijs Gutmans (LAT)

Round of 16; April 17
Merab Turkadze (GEO)	18
Patrik Velký (CZE)	4
Răzvan Andreiana (ROU)	17
Mateusz Polski (POL)	9
Michal Zátorský (SVK)	9
Denis Makarov (GER)	14
Krisztián Nagy (HUN)	9
Magomed Abdulhamidov (AZE)	13
Siarhei Kunitsyn (BLR)	8
Edgaras Skurdelis (LTU)	20
Anthony Bret (FRA)	10
Dennis Ceylan (DEN)	12
Pavlo Ishchenko (UKR)	17
Veaceslav Gojan (MDA)	7
Matti Koota (FIN)	7
Bashir Hassan (SWE)	10

Quarterfinals; April 18
Merab Turkadze (GEO)	21
Răzvan Andreiana (ROU)	11
Denis Makarov (GER)	4
Magomed Abdulhamidov (AZE)	13
Edgaras Skurdelis (LTU)	11
Dennis Ceylan (DEN)	19
Pavlo Ishchenko (UKR)	14
Bashir Hassan (SWE)	8

Semifinals; April 20
Merab Turkadze (GEO)
Magomed Abdulhamidov (AZE)	WO
Dennis Ceylan (DEN)	7
Pavlo Ishchenko (UKR)	13

Final; April 21
Magomed Abdulhamidov (AZE)
Pavlo Ishchenko (UKR)	WO

=== Lightweight ===
Round of 32 – April 15
	Score	
Josh Taylor (GBR)	15–6	Miroslav Šerban (CZE)
Gregor Debeljak (SLO)	4–16	Alexandros Tsanikidis (GRE)
Branimir Stanković (SRB)	15–16	Vladimir Sarukhanyan (ARM)
Eric Pambani (ESP)	10–24	Evaldas Petrauskas (LTU)
Tomáš Vaňo (SVK)	15–13	Dawid Michelus (POL)
Artur Bril (GER)	17–11	Rashid Kassem (DEN)
David Oliver Joyce (IRL)	RET	Joe Cordina (GBR)
Roy Kharmats (ISR)	15–19	Petru Apostol (MDA)
Sam Maxwell (GBR)	RSCI	Albert Selimov (RUS)
Fatih Keleş (TUR)	22–4	Ivan Obradović (AUT)
Elvin Isayev (AZE)	22–14	Alexandru Cuciureanu (ROU)

Round of 16; April 17
Redouane Kaya (SWE)	9
Koba Pkhakadze (GEO)	+9
Vazgen Safaryants (BLR)	16
Elian Dimitrov (BUL)	12
Artjoms Ramlavs (LAT)	4
Josh Taylor (GBR)	14
Alexandros Tsanikidis (GRE)	12
Vladimir Sarukhanyan (ARM)	16
Evaldas Petrauskas (LTU)	13
Tomáš Vaňo (SVK)	8
Artur Bril (GER)	14
David Oliver Joyce (IRL)	22
Petru Apostol (MDA)	10
Sam Maxwell (GBR)	20
Fatih Keleş (TUR)	18
Elvin Isayev (AZE)	16

Quarterfinals; April 18
Koba Pkhakadze (GEO)	7
Vazgen Safaryants (BLR)	15
Josh Taylor (GBR)	17
Vladimir Sarukhanyan (ARM)	9
Evaldas Petrauskas (LTU)	19
David Oliver Joyce (IRL)	10
Sam Maxwell (GBR)	8
Fatih Keleş (TUR)	17

Semifinals; April 20
Vazgen Safaryants (BLR)	13
Josh Taylor (GBR)	10
Evaldas Petrauskas (LTU)	WO
Fatih Keleş (TUR)

Final; April 21
Vazgen Safaryants (BLR)
Evaldas Petrauskas (LTU)	WO

=== Light welterweight ===
Round of 16; April 16
Ross Hickey (IRL)	11
Dumitru Galagoţ (MDA)	24
Zdeněk Chládek (CZE)	10
Ljubomir Marjanović (SRB)	12
Danijel Vekić (CRO)
Yakup Şener (TUR)	RSC
Artem Zaytsev (RUS)	23
Subhi Taha Amara (ISR)	5
Ara Puluzyan (ARM)	14
Xhuljo Vrenozi (ALB)	5
Chabane Fehim (FRA)	17
Bruno Torres (POR)	6
Artem Harutyunyan (GER)	18
Aliaksei Haletsich (BLR)	10

Quarterfinals; April 18
Artūrs Ahmetovs (LAT)	12
Dumitru Galagoţ (MDA)	19
Ljubomir Marjanovic (SRB)	3
Yakup Şener (TUR)	9
Artem Zaytsev (RUS)	19
Ara Puluzyan (ARM)	8
Chabane Fehim (FRA)	17
Artem Harutyunyan (GER)	13

Semifinals; April 20
Dumitru Galagoţ (MDA)	10
Yakup Şener (TUR)	15
Artem Zaytsev (RUS)	14
Chabane Fehim (FRA)	16

Final; April 21
Yakup Şener (TUR)	16
Chabane Fehim (FRA)	11

=== Welterweight ===
Round of 32 – April 15
	Score	
Mahamed Nurudzinau (BLR)	+8–8	Borna Katalinić (CRO)
Danilo Creati (ITA)	7–12	Abdülkadir Köroğlu (TUR)

Round of 16; April 16
Astmer Bilali (ALB)	18
Zaal Kvachatadze (GEO)	17
Ionuţ Gheorghe (ROU)	18
Michalis Michailidis (CYP)	5
Tomasz Kot (POL)	9
Adam Nolan (IRL)	14
Tamerlan Abdullayev (AZE)	+12
Simeon Chamov (BUL)	12
Robert Bilík (CZE)	6
Patrick Wojcicki (GER)	14
Hrayr Matevosyan (ARM)	RSC
Muhnd Bakry (ISR)
Dmitri Kormilin (EST)
Imre Bacskai (HUN)	RSCI
Mahamed Nurudzinau (BLR)	10
Abdülkadir Köroğlu (TUR)	21

Quarterfinals; April 18
Astmer Bilali (ALB)	8
Ionuţ Gheorghe (ROU)	19
Adam Nolan (IRL)	17
Tamerlan Abdullayev (AZE)	13
Patrick Wojcicki (GER)	9
Hrayr Matevosyan (ARM)	6
Imre Bacskai (HUN)	14
Abdülkadir Köroğlu (TUR)	21

Semifinals; April 20
Ionuţ Gheorghe (ROU)	10
Adam Nolan (IRL)	19
Patrick Wojcicki (GER)	19
Abdülkadir Köroğlu (TUR)	11

Final; April 21
Adam Nolan (IRL)	+14
Patrick Wojcicki (GER)	14

=== Middleweight ===
Round of 32 – April 15
	Score	
Danijel Topalović (BIH)	6–9	Kyriakos Spanos (CYP)
Maxim Koptyakov (RUS)	14–5	Arbi Chakaev (AUT)

Round of 16; April 16
Artem Masliy (ISR)	9
Kaupo Arro (EST)	15
Rachid Hamani (FRA)	10
Vitali Bandarenka (BLR)	14
Fatlum Zuta (MKD)	5
Anthony Ogogo (GBR)	18
Vladimiras Milevskis (LTU)	9
Jaba Khositashvili (GEO)	17
Luca Capuano (ITA)	16
Tomasz Jabłoński (POL)	21
Sanjin Pol Vrgoč (CRO)	8
Davide Faraci (SUI)	15
Adem Kılıççı (TUR)	15
Aljaž Venko (SLO)	4
Kyriakos Spanos (CYP)	3
Maxim Koptyakov (RUS)	12

Quarterfinals; April 18
Kaupo Arro (EST)	9
Vitali Bandarenka (BLR)	16
Anthony Ogogo (GBR)	+14
Jaba Khositashvili (GEO)	14
Tomasz Jabłoński (POL)	9
Davide Faraci (SUI)	15
Adem Kılıççı (TUR)	+13
Maxim Koptyakov (RUS)	13

Semifinals; April 20
Vitali Bandarenka (BLR)	7
Anthony Ogogo (GBR)	14
Davide Faraci (SUI)	6
Adem Kılıççı (TUR)	18

Final; April 21
Anthony Ogogo (GBR)
Adem Kılıççı (TUR)	WO

=== Light heavyweight ===
Round of 32 – April 15
	Score	
Bahram Muzaffer (TUR)	13–7	Christian Demaj (ALB)
Kennedy Katende (SWE)	6–16	Joe Ward (IRL)
Simone Fiori (ITA)	10–9	Peter Mullenberg (NED)
Iago Kiziria (GEO)	17–+17	Nikolajs Grišuņins (LAT)
Abdelkader Bouhenia (FRA)	15–11	Marko Nikolić (SRB)
Darko Kučuk (BIH)	10–14	Sandro Dirnfeld (SVK)
Arthur Khachatryan (ARM)	14–16	Mateusz Tryc (POL)
Abner Lloveras (ESP)	14–17	Vatan Huseynli (AZE)
Ainar Karlson (EST)	11–13	Imre Szellő (HUN)
Daugirdas Šemiotas (LTU)	8–14	Victor Cotiujanschii (MDA)
Boško Drašković (MNE)	16–12	Bojan Mišković (CRO)
Callum Smith (GBR)	16–13	Mladen Manev (BUL)

Round of 16; April 16
Mikhail Dauhaliavets (BLR)	16
Matic Samastur (SLO)	6
Ioannis Militopoulos (GRE)	10
Ville Hukkanen (FIN)	20
Bahram Muzaffer (TUR)	18
Joe Ward (IRL)	15
Simone Fiori (ITA)	7
Nikolajs Grišuņins (LAT)	10
Abdelkader Bouhenia (FRA)	16
Sandro Dirnfeld (SVK)	10
Mateusz Tryc (POL)	13
Vatan Huseynli (AZE)	14
Imre Szellő (HUN)	20
Victor Cotiujanschii (MDA)	15
Boško Drašković (MNE)	8
Callum Smith (GBR)	18

Quarterfinals; April 18
Mikhail Dauhaliavets (BLR)	RSCI
Ville Hukkanen (FIN)
Bahram Muzaffer (TUR)	16
Nikolajs Grišuņins (LAT)	5
Abdelkader Bouhenia (FRA)	8
Vatan Huseynli (AZE)	16
Imre Szellő (HUN)	6
Callum Smith (GBR)	16

Semifinals; April 20
Mikhail Dauhaliavets (BLR)	14
Bahram Muzaffer (TUR)	19
Vatan Huseynli (AZE)	16
Callum Smith (GBR)	14

Final; April 21
Bahram Muzaffer (TUR)	18
Vatan Huseynli (AZE)	12

=== Heavyweight ===
Round of 16; April 16
Tommy McCarthy (IRL)	12
Alem Čolpa (BIH)	3
Ümit Can Patır (TUR)	22
Gunnar Kristinsson (ISL)	8
Vladimir Cheleş (MDA)	19
Johann Witt (GER)	10
Cezar Juratoni (ROU)
Marko Čalić (CRO)	RSC
Rain Karlson (EST)	15
Mustapha Chadlioui (ESP)	5
Aboulaye Diane (FRA)	17
Warren Baister (GBR)	18
Tervel Pulev (BUL)	12
Marko Radonjić (MNE)	3

Quarterfinals; April 18
József Darmos (HUN)	7
Tommy McCarthy (IRL)	16
Ümit Can Patır (TUR)	13
Vladimir Cheleş (MDA)	21
Marko Čalić (CRO)	14
Rain Karlson (EST)	7
Warren Baister (GBR)	5
Tervel Pulev (BUL)	19

Semifinals; April 20
Tommy McCarthy (IRL)	12
Vladimir Cheleş (MDA)	15
Marko Čalić (CRO)	12
Tervel Pulev (BUL)	14

Final; April 21
Vladimir Cheleş (MDA)	6
Tervel Pulev (BUL)	12

=== Super heavyweight ===
Round of 32 – April 15
	Score	
Mihail Muntean (MDA)	RSC	Magomed Omarov (RUS)
Viktar Zuyeu (BLR)	15–14	Roman Kapitonenko (UKR)
Evgenios Lazaridis (GRE)	7–12	Kaspar Vaha (EST)
Ņikita Maculevičs (LAT)	RET	Filip Hrgović (CRO)

Round of 16; April 16
Primislav Dimovski (MKD)	8
Labinot Xhoxhaj (SLO)	13
Roman Marynovski (ISR)	9
István Bernáth (HUN)	16
Otto Wallin (SWE)
Mihai Nistor (ROU)	KO
Milutin Stanković (SRB)	6
Tony Yoka (FRA)	10
Vitalijus Subačius (LTU)	RSC
Mikheil Bakhtidze (GEO)
Erhan Muhammet Acı (TUR)	17
Con Sheehan (IRL)	12
Magomed Omarov (RUS)	16
Viktar Zuyeu (BLR)	7
Kaspar Vaha (EST)	RET
Filip Hrgović (CRO)

Quarterfinals; April 18
Labinot Xhoxhaj (SLO)	4
István Bernáth (HUN)	14
Mihai Nistor (ROU)	9
Tony Yoka (FRA)	13
Vitalijus Subačius (LTU)	11
Erhan Muhammet Acı (TUR)	15
Magomed Omarov (RUS)	15
Filip Hrgović (CRO)	14

Semifinals; April 20
István Bernáth (HUN)	2
Tony Yoka (FRA)	12
Erhan Muhammet Acı (TUR)
Magomed Omarov (RUS)	RSC

Final; April 21
Tony Yoka (FRA)	RET
Magomed Omarov (RUS)

== See also ==
- Boxing at the 2012 Summer Olympics – Qualification
