= 2011 World Amateur Boxing Championships – Welterweight =

Boxing competitions

The Welterweight competition was the fifth-heaviest class featured at the 2011 World Amateur Boxing Championships, held at the Heydar Aliyev Sports and Exhibition Complex. Boxers were limited to a maximum of 69 kilograms (152 lb) in body mass.

== Medalists ==
Gold	Taras Shelestyuk (UKR)
Silver	Serik Sapiyev (KAZ)
Bronze	Egidijus Kavaliauskas (LTU)
Bronze	Krishan Vikas (IND)

== Seeds ==
1. (Hungary) Imre Bacskai (third round)
2. (Brazil) Myke Ribeiro (first round)
3. (Russia) Andrey Zamkovoy (quarterfinals)
4. (Wales) Freddie Evans (quarterfinals)
5. (China) Maitituersun Qiong (first round)
6. (France) Alexis Vastine (third round)
7. (Belarus) Mahamed Nurudzinau (second round)
8. (Azerbaijan) Emil Ahmedov (first round)
9. (Kazakhstan) Serik Sapiyev (runner-up)
10. (Algeria) Ilyas Abbadi (first round)

== Draw ==
=== Finals ===
Semifinals
1	Serik Sapiyev (KAZ)	RET
4	Egidijus Kavaliauskas (LTU)
3	Taras Shelestyuk (UKR)	15
2	Krishan Vikas (IND)	12

Final
Serik Sapiyev (KAZ)	10
Taras Shelestyuk (UKR)	16

=== Top half ===
==== Section 1 ====
First round
Gabriel Maestre (VEN)	15
Oscar Molina (MEX)	12
Kitson Julie (SEY)	4
Custio Clayton (CAN)	21
Errol Spence (USA)	28
Amin Ghasemipour (IRI)	10
Serik Sapiyev (KAZ)	RSC
Carlos Sanchez (ECU)
Apichet Saensit (THA)	20
Nayden Stoyanov (BUL)	11
Yasuhiro Suzuki (JPN)	RSC
Muhammed Camara (GAM)
Danilo Creati (ITA)	19
Emil Ahmedov (AZE)	13

Second round
Imre Bacskai (HUN)	22
Gabriel Maestre (VEN)	9
Custio Clayton (CAN)	9
Errol Spence (USA)	18
Serik Sapiyev (KAZ)	16
Apichet Saensit (THA)	7
Yasuhiro Suzuki (JPN)	19
Danilo Creati (ITA)	11

Third round
Imre Bacskai (HUN)	16
Errol Spence (USA)	26
Serik Sapiyev (KAZ)	25
Yasuhiro Suzuki (JPN)	12

Quarterfinals
Errol Spence (USA)	10
Serik Sapiyev (KAZ)	20

==== Section 2 ====
First round
Maitituersun Qiong (CHN)	16
Egidijus Kavaliauskas (LTU)	20
Michal Babiak (SVK)
Robert Bilik (CZE)	RSC
Carl Hield (BAH)	10
Roy Sheehan (IRL)	15
Borna Katalinic (CRO)	14
Su Chin-Cheng (TPE)	10
Leon Chartoi (SWE)	19
Konstantin Snigour (ISR)	11
Patrick Wojcicki (GER)	12
Joseph Mulema (CMR)	11
Kim Chun-Sik (KOR)	19
Mohamed Diaby (MLI)	11
Ricky Murphy (NZL)	6
Freddie Evans (WAL)	21

Second round
Egidijus Kavaliauskas (LTU)	15
Robert Bilik (CZE)	4
Roy Sheehan (IRL)	21
Borna Katalinic (CRO)	17
Leon Chartoi (SWE)	11
Patrick Wojcicki (GER)	12
Kim Chun-Sik (KOR)	8
Freddie Evans (WAL)	17

Third round
Egidijus Kavaliauskas (LTU)	11
Roy Sheehan (IRL)	7
Patrick Wojcicki (GER)	6
Freddie Evans (WAL)	12

Quarterfinals
Egidijus Kavaliauskas (LTU)	RSCH
Freddie Evans (WAL)

=== Bottom half ===
==== Section 3 ====
First round
Andrey Zamkovoy (RUS)	14
Moustapha Abdoulaye (NIG)	2
Tuvshinbat Byamba (MGL)	21
Samvel Matevosyan (ARM)	11
Joseph Deireragea (NRU)	6
Omar Mametshayev (TKM)	21
Juan Boholst (PHI)	11
Stephen Danyo (NED)	16
Torben Keller (DEN)	8
Taras Shelestyuk (UKR)	23
Velibor Vidic (BIH)	4
Carlos Banteur (CUB)	17
Mehdi Khalsi (MAR)	29
Dossou Houenou (BEN)	8
Scott Cardle (ENG)	14
Alexis Vastine (FRA)	22

Second round
Andrey Zamkovoy (RUS)	14
Tuvshinbat Byamba (MGL)	8
Omar Mametshayev (TKM)	7
Stephen Danyo (NED)	15
Taras Shelestyuk (UKR)	17
Carlos Banteur (CUB)	15
Mehdi Khalsi (MAR)	7
Alexis Vastine (FRA)	18

Third round
Andrey Zamkovoy (RUS)	17
Stephen Danyo (NED)	5
Taras Shelestyuk (UKR)	18
Alexis Vastine (FRA)	11

Quarterfinals
Andrey Zamkovoy (RUS)	13
Taras Shelestyuk (UKR)	+13

==== Section 4 ====
First round
Mahamed Nurudzinau (BLR)	16
Astmer Bilali (ALB)	7
Krishan Vikas (IND)	16
Asadullo Boimurodov (KGZ)	8
Kamil Szeremeta (POL)	10
Onder Sipal (TUR)	14
Zaal Kvachatadze (GEO)	22
Ilyas Abbadi (ALG)	13
Alexander Jacobsen (NOR)	15
Mark Basile (AUS)	20
Norris Thompson (GHA)	13
Komiljon Kholiqov (TJK)	22
Ionuţ Gheorghe (ROU)	23
Nodirbek Kosimov (UZB)	17
Vasili Belous (MDA)
Myke Ribeiro (BRA)	DSQ

Second round
Mahamed Nurudzinau (BLR)	10
Krishan Vikas (IND)	+10
Onder Sipal (TUR)	25
Zaal Kvachatadze (GEO)	20
Mark Basile (AUS)	13
Komiljon Kholiqov (TJK)	6
Ionuţ Gheorghe (ROU)	9
Vasili Belous (MDA)	15

Third round
Krishan Vikas (IND)	14
Onder Sipal (TUR)	7
Mark Basile (AUS)	9
Vasili Belous (MDA)	18

Quarterfinals
Krishan Vikas (IND)	9
Vasili Belous (MDA)	8
