= 2009 World Amateur Boxing Championships – Welterweight =

Boxing competitions

The Welterweight competition was the fifth-highest weight class featured at the 2009 World Amateur Boxing Championships, and was held at the Mediolanum Forum. Welterweights were limited to a maximum of 69 kilograms in body mass.

== Medalists ==
Gold	Jack Culcay-Keth; Germany
Silver	Andrey Zamkovoy; Russia
Bronze	Botirjon Makhmudov; Uzbekistan
Bronze	Serik Sapiyev; Kazakhstan

== Seeds ==
1. (Cuba) Carlos Banteux (third round)
2. (Kazakhstan) Serik Sapiyev (semifinals)
3. (Belarus) Magomed Nurutdinov (second round)
4. (Mexico) Oscar Molina (third round)
5. (France) Jaoid Chiguer (second round)
6. (Germany) Jack Culcay-Keth (champion)
7. (Uzbekistan) Botirjon Makhmudov (semifinals)
8. (Turkmenistan) Omar Mamedshayev (first round)

== Draw ==
=== Finals ===
Quarterfinals
Mikaël Zewski (CAN)	2
Botirjon Makhmudov (UZB)	5
Jack Culcay-Keth (GER)	5
Torben Keller (DEN)	2
William McLoughlin (IRL)	7
Andrey Zamkovoy (RUS)	16
Asadullo Boimurodov (KGZ)
Serik Sapiyev (KAZ)	RET

Semifinals
Botirjon Makhmudov (UZB)	4
Jack Culcay-Keth (GER)	6
Andrey Zamkovoy (RUS)	16
Serik Sapiyev (KAZ)	10

Final
Jack Culcay-Keth (GER)	7
Andrey Zamkovoy (RUS)	4

=== Top half ===
==== Section 1 ====
Round 1

Round 2
Carlos Banteux (CUB)	11
Errol Spence (USA)	1
Mehdi Khalsi (MAR)	2
Mikaël Zewski (CAN)	10
Alessandro Marziali (ITA)	4
Konstantin Snigour (ISR)	11
Lusizi Siphawk (RSA)	9
Botirjon Makhmudov (UZB)	15

Round 3
Carlos Banteux (CUB)	2
Mikaël Zewski (CAN)	5
Konstantin Snigour (ISR)	3
Botirjon Makhmudov (UZB)	12

Quarterfinals
Mikaël Zewski (CAN)	2
Botirjon Makhmudov (UZB)	5

==== Section 2 ====
Round 1
Hosam Bakr Abdin (EGY)	8
Bojan Pesic (MNE)	1
Martin Svoboda (CZE)
Jan Romanovskij (LTU)	RSCH
Brian Castaño (ARG)	22
Mark Basile (AUS)	8
Torben Keller (DEN)	22
Otgonjargal Jargal (MGL)	4
Bruno Bongongo (CAF)
Jakhongir Ubaydulloev (TJK)	WO
Abdallah Hawawreh (JOR)	7
Kitson Gery Julie (SEY)	12
Muhammad Firmansyah (INA)	3
Oscar Molina (MEX)	14

Round 2
Jack Culcay-Keth (GER)	10
Hosam Bakr Abdin (EGY)	5
Jan Romanovskij (LTU)	5
Brian Castaño (ARG)	21
Torben Keller (DEN)	14
Jakhongir Ubaydulloev (TJK)	5
Kitson Gery Julie (SEY)	3
Oscar Molina (MEX)	13

Round 3
Jack Culcay-Keth (GER)	14
Brian Castaño (ARG)	5
Torben Keller (DEN)	9
Oscar Molina (MEX)	4

Quarterfinals
Jack Culcay-Keth (GER)	5
Torben Keller (DEN)	2

=== Bottom half ===
==== Section 3 ====
Round 1
Magomed Nurutdinov (BLR)	15
Nikolai Kodin (FIN)	7
Kakhaber Zhvania (GEO)	RSCH
Yoshiyuki Hirano (JPN)
Come Ndayishimiye (BDI)
William McLoughlin (IRL)	RSCH
Albert Temaititahio (PYF)	6
Velibor Vidic (BIH)	11
Balázs Bacskai (HUN)	17
Vasilii Belous (MDA)	4
Pedro Lima (BRA)	RSC
Orhan Ozturk (TUR)
Andrey Zamkovoy (RUS)	29
Vincent Otieno (KEN)	0
Omid Noorani (AFG)
Jaoid Chiguer (FRA)	RSC

Round 2
Magomed Nurutdinov (BLR)
Kakhaber Zhvania (GEO)	WO
William McLoughlin (IRL)	14
Velibor Vidic (BIH)	3
Balázs Bacskai (HUN)	18
Pedro Lima (BRA)	13
Andrey Zamkovoy (RUS)	24
Jaoid Chiguer (FRA)	11

Round 3
Kakhaber Zhvania (GEO)	5
William McLoughlin (IRL)	7
Balázs Bacskai (HUN)	3
Andrey Zamkovoy (RUS)	15

Quarterfinals
William McLoughlin (IRL)	7
Andrey Zamkovoy (RUS)	16

==== Section 4 ====
Round 1
Omar Mamedshayev (TKM)	9
Jun Young Man (KOR)	10
Asadullo Boimurodov (KGZ)	12
Cristian Peguero (PUR)	3
Samvel Matevosyan (ARM)	4
Jetmir Kuci (ALB)	10
Peter Harnadek (SVK)	3
Zoran Mitrovic (SRB)	25
Önder Şipal (TUR)	RSC
Hing Hinsay (CAM)
Taras Shelestyuk (UKR)	10
Leon Chartoi (SWE)	3
Habib Ahmed (GHA)	5
Emil Maharramov (AZE)	17
Hugo Miyenikoue (GAB)
Serik Sapiyev (KAZ)	RSC

Round 2
Jun Young Man (KOR)	17
Asadullo Boimurodov (KGZ)	20
Jetmir Kuci (ALB)	15
Zoran Mitrovic (SRB)	5
Önder Şipal (TUR)	6
Taras Shelestyuk (UKR)	14
Emil Maharramov (AZE)
Serik Sapiyev (KAZ)	RSC

Round 3
Asadullo Boimurodov (KGZ)	WO
Jetmir Kuci (ALB)
Taras Shelestyuk (UKR)	11
Serik Sapiyev (KAZ)	'16

Quarterfinals
Asadullo Boimurodov (KGZ)
Serik Sapiyev (KAZ)	RET

== See also ==
- Boxing at the 2008 Summer Olympics – Welterweight
