= Boxing at the 2012 Summer Olympics – Men's welterweight =

Men's welterweight boxing at the Games of the XXX Olympiad
- Venue: ExCeL Exhibition Centre
- Date: 29 July to 12 August 2012
- Competitors: 28 from 28 nations

Medalists
1st place, gold medalist(s)		Serik Sapiyev	Kazakhstan
2nd place, silver medalist(s)		Fred Evans	Great Britain
3rd place, bronze medalist(s)		Taras Shelestyuk	Ukraine
3rd place, bronze medalist(s)		Andrey Zamkovoy	Russia

The men's welterweight boxing competition at the 2012 Olympic Games in London was held between 31 July and 12 August at the ExCeL Exhibition Centre.

Twenty-eight boxers from 28 nations competed.

== Competition format ==
The competition consisted of a single-elimination tournament. Bronze medals were awarded to both semifinal losers. Bouts were three rounds of three minutes each.

== Schedule ==
All times are British Summer Time (UTC+1)

Date	Time	Round
Sunday 29 July 2012	15:00 & 22:00	Round of 32
Friday 3 August 2012	14:30 & 21:30	Round of 16
Tuesday 7 August 2012	21:30	Quarter-finals
Friday 10 August 2012	21:30	Semi-finals
Sunday 12 August 2012	14:15	Final

== Results ==
=== Finals ===
Semi-finals
Taras Shelestyuk (UKR)	10
Fred Evans (GBR)	11
Andrey Zamkovoy (RUS)	12
Serik Sapiyev (KAZ)	18

Final
Fred Evans (GBR)	9
Serik Sapiyev (KAZ)	17

=== Top half ===
Round of 32
Seleman Kidunda (TAN)	7
Vasile Belous (MDA)	20
Byambyn Tüvshinbat (MGL)	17
Yannick Mitoumba (GAB)	4
Alexis Vastine (FRA)	16
Patrick Wojcicki (GER)	12
Custio Clayton (CAN)	12
Óscar Molina (MEX)	8
Moustapha Hima (NIG)	6
Cameron Hammond (AUS)	13
Fred Evans (GBR)	18
Ilyas Abbadi (ALG)	10

Round of 16
Taras Shelestyuk (UKR)	15
Vasile Belous (MDA)	7
Byambyn Tüvshinbat (MGL)	12
Alexis Vastine (FRA)	13
Custio Clayton (CAN)	14
Cameron Hammond (AUS)	11
Fred Evans (GBR)	11
Egidijus Kavaliauskas (LTU)	7

Quarter-finals
Taras Shelestyuk (UKR)	18+
Alexis Vastine (FRA)	18
Custio Clayton (CAN)	14
Fred Evans (GBR)	14+

Semi-finals
Taras Shelestyuk (UKR)	10
Fred Evans (GBR)	11

=== Bottom half ===
Round of 32
Myke Carvalho (BRA)	10
Errol Spence (USA)	16
Carlos Sánchez (ECU)	8
Adam Nolan (IRL)	14
Maimaitituersun Qiong (CHN)	11
Andrey Zamkovoy (RUS)	16
Ahmad Abdul-Karim (IRQ)	13
Siphiwe Lusizi (RSA)	17
Gabriel Maestre (VEN)	13
Amin Ghasemipour (IRI)	8
Yasuhiro Suzuki (JPN)	14
Mehdi Khalsi (MAR)	13

Round of 16
Vikas Krishan Yadav (IND)	13
Errol Spence (USA)	15*
Adam Nolan (IRL)	9
Andrey Zamkovoy (RUS)	18
Siphiwe Lusizi (RSA)	13
Gabriel Maestre (VEN)	18
Yasuhiro Suzuki (JPN)	11
Serik Sapiyev (KAZ)	25

Quarter-finals
Errol Spence (USA)	11
Andrey Zamkovoy (RUS)	16
Gabriel Maestre (VEN)	9
Serik Sapiyev (KAZ)	20

Semi-finals
Andrey Zamkovoy (RUS)	12
Serik Sapiyev (KAZ)	18

*Spence successfully appealed his initial 11–13 loss. Using video review, AIBA determined the bout referee gave too few cautions for holding fouls and should have awarded Spence at least four more points.
