= Boxing at the 2013 Summer Universiade – Welterweight =

The men's welterweight boxing competition at the 2013 Summer Universiade in Kazan was held between 5 July and 9 July.

== Results ==
Qualification
S Cissokho (FRA)	2
E Suleymanov (AZE)	1
S Chamov (BUL)	0
V Belous (MDA)	3
D Lazarev (UKR)	0
O Sipal (TUR)	3
Y Ramashkevich (BLR)	3
C SU (TPE)	0

Round of 16
G Haider (PAK)	KO
Y Ramashkevich (BLR)	RD1 1:21
H Normatov (UZB)	3
Y Mendez Rojas (MEX)	0
R Kuncaitas (LTU)	TKO
N Piraki (TJK)	RD2 2:35
V Belous (MDA)	0
T Byamba (MGL)	3
S Hudayberdiyev (TKM)	0
O Sipal (TUR)	3
A Masiumov (KGZ)	0
D Morello (ITA)	3
B Kozhabekov (KAZ)	1
A Zamkovoi (RUS)	2
Y Rama Shkevich (BLR)	3
D Lee (KOR)	0

Quarter-finals
S Cissokho (FRA)	1
H Normatov (UZB)	2
N Piaki (TJK)	0
T Byamba (MGL)	3
O Sipal (TUR)	3
D Morello (ITA)	0
A Zamkovoi (RUS)	3
Y Ramashkevich (BLR)	0

Semi-finals
H Normatov (UZB)	2
T Byamba (MGL)	1
O Siipal (TUR)	0
A Zamkovoi (RUS)	3

Finals
H Normatov (UZB)	0
A Zamkovoi (RUS)	3
