= Mikaël Zewski =

Canadian boxer

Personal information
- Born: February 13, 1989 (age 37) Trois-Rivières, Quebec, Canada
- Height: 5 ft 10 in (178 cm)
- Weight: Light middleweight; Welterweight

Boxing career
- Reach: 70 in (178 cm)
- Stance: Orthodox

Boxing record
- Total fights: 38
- Wins: 35
- Win by KO: 23
- Losses: 3

Mikaël Zewski (born February 13, 1989) is a Canadian professional boxer. At regional level he has held multiple welterweight titles, including the WBC-NABF title from 2014 to 2015 and the WBO-NABO title from 2019 to 2020.

== Amateur career ==
During his amateur career, Zewski became a four-time Canadian National Champion and achieved a record of 138–29. He won a bronze medal at the 2007 Canada Games, and upset Cuban Carlos Banteux at the 2009 World Amateur Boxing Championships. Zewski beat Jack Culcay two months prior to the World Championships in a Germany-Canada clash. Culcay won the World Championships.

== Professional career ==
Upon turning professional, he was first signed to now defunct TKO Promotions in early 2010. After the end of operations of his original promoter, Mikael became the first Canadian boxer to sign with Oscar De La Hoya's Golden Boy Promotions, but later decided to sign with rival Top Rank.

== Professional boxing record ==
38 fights	35 wins	3 losses
By knockout	23	2
By decision	12	1

No.	Result	Record	Opponent	Type	Round, time	Date	Location	Notes
38	Loss	35-3	(Mexico) Carlos Ocampo	TKO	9 (10)	2022-03-25	(Canada) Colisee, Trois-Rivières	For vacant WBC Continental Americas welterweight title
37	Win	35-2	(Mexico) Dilan Loza Burgos	UD	8 (8)	2021-08-28	(Canada) Stade IGA, Montreal	
36	Loss	34-2	(Lithuania) Egidijus Kavaliauskas	TKO	8 (10)	2020-09-12	(United States) MGM Grand, Las Vegas, Nevada, US	Lost WBO-NABO, For WBC Continental Americas welterweight title
35	Win	34-1	(Mexico) Alejandro Davila	TKO	10 (10)	2019-11-23	(Canada) Videotron Centre, Montreal, Quebec	Retained WBO-NABO and IBF North American welterweight titles
34	Win	33-1	(Mexico) Abner Lopez	UD	10 (10)	2019-06-28	(Canada) Montreal Casino, Montreal, Quebec	Won vacant WBO-NABO and IBF North American welterweight titles
33	Win	32-1	(Mexico) Aaron Herrera	UD	10 (10)	2018-12-01	(Canada) Videotron Centre, Montreal, Quebec	Retained WBC International welterweight title
32	Win	31-1	(Argentina) Diego Gonzalo Luque	UD	10 (10)	2018-05-19	Air Canada Centre, Toronto, Ontario	Won vacant WBC International welterweight title
31	Win	30-1	(Mexico) Jose de Jesus Macias	UD	8 (8)	2018-02-15	(Canada) Montreal Casino, Montreal, Quebec	
30	Win	29-1	(Argentina) Enrique Martin Escobar	TKO	2 (8)	2017-12-07	(Canada) Montreal Casino, Montreal, Quebec	
29	Win	28-1	(Mexico) Fernando Silva	UD	8 (8)	2017-06-03	(Canada) Bell Centre, Montreal, Quebec	
28	Win	27-1	(Ghana) Ayi Bruce	KO	5 (10)	2015-10-24	(United States) CenturyLink Center, Omaha, Nebraska	
27	Loss	26-1	(Russia) Konstantin Ponomarev	UD	10 (10)	2015-05-01	(United States) Cosmopolitan of Las Vegas, Las Vegas, Nevada	Lost WBC-NABF welterweight title
26	Win	26-0	(United States) Jeremy Bryan	MD	10 (10)	2014-12-13	(United States) Cosmopolitan of Las Vegas, Las Vegas, Nevada	Retained WBC-NABF welterweight title
25	Win	25-0	(Mexico) Roberto Ventura	KO	2 (10)	2014-10-04	(United States) Bally's Atlantic City, Atlantic City, New Jersey	
24	Win	24-0	(Ghana) Prince Doku, Jr.	KO	4 (10)	2014-06-28	(United States) CenturyLink Center, Omaha, Nebraska	Won WBC-NABF welterweight title
23	Win	23-0	(Poland) Krzysztof Szot	TKO	7 (8)	2014-01-18	(Canada) Bell Centre, Montreal, Quebec	
22	Win	22-0	(United States) Ryan Davis	TKO	3 (8)	2013-11-30	(Canada) Colisée Pepsi, Quebec City, Quebec	
21	Win	21-0	(United States) Alberto Herrera	RTD	5 (8)	2013-10-12	(United States) Thomas & Mack Center, Las Vegas	
20	Win	20-0	(Cuba) Damian Frias	UD	8 (8)	2013-06-15	(United States) American Airlines Center, Dallas	
19	Win	19-0	(Puerto Rico) Daniel Sostre	KO	2 (8)	2013-04-13	(United States) Radio City Music Hall, New York City	
18	Win	18-0	(United States) Brandon Hoskins	TKO	4 (6)	2013-01-19	(United States) Madison Square Garden, New York City	
17	Win	17-0	(Mexico) Cesar Chavez	KO	1 (8)	2012-11-03	(Canada) Bell Centre, Montreal, Quebec	
16	Win	16-0	(United States) Xavier Toliver	KO	1 (8)	2012-09-13	(United States) Hard Rock Hotel and Casino, Las Vegas, Nevada	
15	Win	15-0	(United States) John Ryan Grimaldo	KO	3 (8)	2012-06-09	(United States) MGM Grand, Las Vegas, Nevada	
14	Win	14-0	(United States) Brandon Baue	TKO	6 (8)	2012-04-14	(United States) Mandalay Bay, Las Vegas, Nevada	
13	Win	13-0	(United States) Joel Vargas	TKO	1 (6)	2012-03-17	(United States) Bally's Atlantic City, Atlantic City, New Jersey	
12	Win	12-0	(United States) Gundrick King	TKO	5 (6)	2011-11-11	(United States) Mandalay Bay, Las Vegas, Nevada	
11	Win	11-0	(United States) Keuntray Henson	KO	1 (6)	2011-10-22	(United States) The Theater at Madison Square Garden, New York City, New York	
10	Win	10-0	(United States) Ruben Galvan	KO	3 (8)	2011-05-21	(Canada) Bell Centre, Montreal, Quebec	
9	Win	9-0	(United States) Clint Coronel	SD	6 (6)	2011-04-09	(United States) MGM Grand, Las Vegas, Nevada	
8	Win	8-0	(Mexico) Gerardo Cesar Prieto	TKO	3 (6)	2011-03-04	(United States) Fantasy Springs Resort Casino, Indio, California	
7	Win	7-0	(Dominican Republic) Joseph De los Santos	UD	6 (6)	2011-02-04	Coliseo Felix Mendez Acevedo, Lares, Puerto Rico	
6	Win	6-0	(Peru) Leonardo Rojas	TKO	2 (4)	2010-12-18	(Canada) Colisée Pepsi, Quebec City, Quebec	
5	Win	5-0	(United States) Ardrick Butler	UD	4 (4)	2010-11-06	(United States) Prudential Center, Newark, New Jersey	
4	Win	4-0	(United States) John Hoffman	TKO	1 (4)	2010-05-28	(Canada) Colisée Pepsi, Quebec City, Quebec	
3	Win	3-0	(United States) Alex De Leon	UD	4 (4)	2010-05-01	(United States) Johnson County Fairgrounds, Iowa City, Iowa	
2	Win	2-0	(Mexico) Moses Alvizo	RTD	2 (4)	2010-03-25	(United States) Commerce Casino, Commerce, California	
1	Win	1-0	(United States) Kelvin Kibler	TKO	3 (4)	2010-02-27	(United States) Bell Auditorium, Augusta, Georgia	
