= Yasuhiro Suzuki =

Japanese boxer

Personal information
- Nationality: Japanese
- Born: November 25, 1987 (age 38) Sapporo, Hokkaido, Japan
- Height: 1.86 m (6 ft 1 in)

Sport
- Sport: Boxing
- Weight class: Welterweight
- Club: Japan Self-Defense Forces

Yasuhiro Suzuki (鈴木 康弘, Suzuki Yasuhiro; born September 13, 1987 in Sapporo, Hokkaido) is a Japanese boxer who competed at the 2012 Summer Olympics in the welterweight division (– 69 kg).

== Early life ==
He is an alumnus of the Takushoku University, and is Second lieutenant in the Japan Ground Self-Defense Force.

== Boxing career ==
Suzuki won the silver medal in the 21st President's Cup in Jakarta, Indonesia in July 2011.

At the 2012 Summer Olympics, Suzuki competed in the Men's welterweight, but was defeated by the eventual gold medal winner Serik Sapiyev in the second round.

== See also ==
- 2011 World Amateur Boxing Championships – Welterweight
- Boxing at the 2012 Summer Olympics – Qualification
