= Speed skating at the 2007 Canada Winter Games =

There were seven long-track speed skating events at the 2007 Canada Winter Games. All long-track events took place at F. H. Collins Secondary School in Whitehorse, Yukon, from 24 to 28 February 2007. For the short-track events see short track speed skating at the 2007 Canada Winter Games.

== 100 metres ==
Medal	Men's	Time	Women's	Time
Gold	(Quebec) Camille Bégin	10.03	(Saskatchewan) Marsha Hudey	11.01
Silver	(Alberta) Lucas Duffield	10.25	(Alberta) Alanna Komisar	11.15
Bronze	(Saskatchewan) William Dutton	10.30	(Manitoba) Shayla Heidinger	11.15

== 500 metres ==
Medal	Men's	Time	Women's	Time
Gold	(Ontario) Richard MacLennan	40.76 + 40.32	(Saskatchewan) Marsha Hudey	45.41 + 45.73
Silver	(Saskatchewan) Austin Hudey	41.01 + 40.11	(Alberta) Anastasia Bucsis	45.40 + 46.15
Bronze	(Ontario) Patrick Marsh	41.34 + 39.98	(Quebec) Michèle Boutin	46.19 + 45.97

== 1000 metres ==
Medal	Women's	Time
Gold	(Quebec) Marie-Pier Gervais-Moreau	1:33.00
Silver	(Manitoba) Shayla Heidinger	1:33.27
Bronze	(Ontario) Maddie Martin	1:33.91

== 1500 metres ==
Medal	Men's	Time	Women's	Time
Gold	(Alberta) Keith Sulzer	2:08.68	(Ontario) Maddie Martin	2:27.04
Silver	(Alberta) Lucas Duffield	2:10.11	(Saskatchewan) Kali Christ	2:33.29
Bronze	(Ontario) Spencer Zettler	2:11.71	(Quebec) Marie-Pier Gervais-Moreau	2:34.29

== 3000 metres ==
Medal	Men's	Time	Women's	Time
Gold	(Quebec) Clovis Auger	4:32:41	(Ontario) Maddie Martin	5:06.48
Silver	(Alberta) Keith Sulzer	4:34.53	(Manitoba) Andrea Johnson	5:18.56
Bronze	(Manitoba) Kyle Gendron	4:37.51	(Quebec) Marie-Pier Gervais-Moreau	5:21.12

== 5000 metres ==
Medal	Men's	Time
Gold	(Quebec) Clovis Auger	8:03.63
Silver	(Alberta) Keith Sulzer	8:07.25
Bronze	(Manitoba) Kyle Gendron	8:08.69

== Team Pursuit ==
Medal	Men's	Time	Women's	Time
Gold	Quebec	4:31:09	Saskatchewan	3:47.11
Silver	Alberta	4:41.03	Ontario	3:50.52
Bronze	British Columbia	4:43.42	Manitoba	3:51.72
