= Short-track speed skating at the 2007 Canada Winter Games =

These are the short track speed skating at the 2007 Canada Games events for the 2007 Canada Winter Games in Whitehorse, Yukon. For the long track events see speed skating at the 2007 Canada Winter Games.

== 500 metres ==
Medal	Men's	Time	Women's	Time
Gold	(Quebec) Guillaume Blais-Dufour	42.776	(Quebec) Marianne St-Gelais	44.832
Silver	(Quebec) Vincent André	42.841	(Quebec) Valérie Lambert	45.282
Bronze	(Ontario) Nicolas Bean	42.968	(Quebec) Valérie Maltais	45.839

== 1000 metres ==
Medal	Men's	Time	Women's	Time
Gold	(Ontario) Nicolas Bean	1:29.554	(Quebec) Marianne St-Gelais	1:40.929
Silver	(Quebec) Guillaume Blais-Dufour	1:29.802	(Ontario) Ivanie Blondin	1:41.182
Bronze	(Quebec) Maxime Fortin	1:54.866	(Quebec) Valérie Maltais	1:41.483

== 1500 metres ==
Medal	Men's	Time	Women's	Time
Gold	(Ontario) Nicolas Bean	2:21.350	(Ontario) Ivanie Blondin	2:27.690
Silver	(Quebec) Guillaume Blais-Dufour	2:21.681	(Quebec) Marianne St-Gelais	2:27.747
Bronze	(Alberta) Steve Buzinkski	2:24.501	(Quebec) Andrea Do-Duc	2:27.877

== 3000 metres ==
Medal	Men's	Time	Women's	Time
Gold	(Quebec) Guillaume Blais-Dufour	4:58.802	(Quebec) Marianne St-Gelais	5:08.537
Silver	(Ontario) Nicolas Bean	5:02.320	(Quebec) Valérie Maltais	5:10.425
Bronze	(Quebec) Mathieu Richer	5:03.937	(Alberta) Gillian Richmond	5:11.830

== 3000 metres Relay ==
Medal	Men's	Time	Women's	Time
Gold	Quebec	4:14.195	Quebec	4:29.524
Silver	Ontario	4:21.722	Ontario	4:34.630
Bronze	New Brunswick	4:30.236	New Brunswick	4:44.231
