= Yakup Şener =

Turkish boxer (born 1990)

Personal information
- Nationality: Turkish
- Born: September 1, 1990 (age 34); Trabzon, Turkey
- Height: 1.70 m (5.6 ft)
- Weight: 64 kg (141 lb)

Sport
- Country: Turkey
- Sport: Amateur boxing
- Event: Light welterweight
- Club: Fenerbahçe Boxing
- Coached by: Mehmet Değirmenci

Yakup Şener (born September 1, 1990 in Trabzon, Turkey) is a Turkish amateur boxer competing in the light welterweight division. The 1.70 m (5.6 ft) tall athlete at 64 kg (141 lb) is a member of Fenerbahçe Boxing in Istanbul.

He studied physical education and sports at the Black Sea Technical University's Vocational College.

In 2006, Şener became bronze medalist in the -54 kg division at the World Cadets Championships held in Istanbul, Turkey. He qualified for the 2012 Summer Olympics, to do so had to win every single fight at the Olympic qualifier held in his hometown.

At the Olympics proper he beat Serge Ambomo of Cameroon, then lost to Uzbek Uktamjon Rahmonov.
