= Patrick Wojcicki =

German boxer

Patrick Wojcicki (born 14 August 1991 in Wolfsburg) is a German boxer. At the 2012 Summer Olympics, he competed in the Men's welterweight, but was defeated in the first round.

== Amateur career ==
In 2008, he reached the quarter-finals of the AIBA Youth World Championships in the 64 kg division. He lost to Uktamjon Rahmonov when the referee stopped the contest. He moved up to the senior division in 2009.

In 2010, he competed at the European Championships in the -69 kg division, losing in the preliminary rounds to Balazs Bacskai. At the 2011 World Championships, he reached the last 16 in the same division, losing to Fred Evans. From 2009 to 2011, he was also three-time German national champion at 69 kg. He also won the Chemiepokal in 2011, defeating Rahmonov in the final. Wojcicki qualified for the 2012 Summer Olympics by beating Abdülkadir Köroğlu in a qualifying tournament in Trabzon. At the 2012 Olympics, he lost 12:16 to Alexis Vastine in the first round.

== Professional career ==
After a period where he focused on kickboxing, Wojcicki signed a contract with Sauerland Events, and made his professional debut on the 21 November 2015. He faced fellow German Surik Donsdean at the TUI Arena in Hannover, winning with a technical knockout in the 4th round. Following nine more wins, he faced his first setback, when his fight against Anatoli Hunanyan was drawn after eight rounds of boxing.

Following that fight, Wojcicki fought Ronny Mittag for the IBF Intercontinental Middleweight title on 18 May 2018. Wojcicki won in a unanimous decision after 12 rounds. Wojcicki defended the title against Sven Elbir and Marcelo Fabian Caceres. Following a victory against Robert Swierzbinski on 9 November 2019, Wojcicki was forced to have long break between fights due to the COVID epidemic. He was due to fight Patrice Volny in an elimination match, where the winner would face Gennady Golovkin, but the match was cancelled due to the epidemic.
