= List of 2007 Canada Winter Games medallists =

This is a list of events and medallists at the 2007 Canada Games.

== Alpine skiing ==
Event	Gold	Silver	Bronze
Men's Super-G	(Alberta) Cam George Brewington	(Alberta) Chris Robert Scheele	(Ontario) Cameron Wickham
Women's Super-G	(Alberta) Andrea Louise Bliss	(Ontario) Krystyn Catherine Peterson	(Quebec) Catherine Morel
Men's Giant Slalom	(Ontario) Christopher Nicholas Barber	(Alberta) Cam George Brewington	(Quebec) Simon Mannella
Women's Giant Slalom	(British Columbia) Kelsey Serwa	(Alberta) Andrea Louise Bliss	(Ontario) Krystyn Catherine Peterson
Men's Slalom	(Ontario) Christopher Nicholas Barber	(Alberta) Chris Robert Scheele	(Quebec) Mathieu Routhier
Women's Giant Slalom	(Ontario) Krystyn Catherine Peterson	(Quebec) Ève Routhier	(Ontario) Kelly Leigh Singer

== Archery ==
Event	Gold	Silver	Bronze
Men Compound Individual	(Alberta) Tristan Lebel	(Manitoba) Adam Berry	(Ontario) Andrew Fagan
Women Compound Individual	(Manitoba) Doris Jones	(Alberta) Ashley Wallace	(Saskatchewan) Jenah Smith
Men Team Compound	Ontario	Saskatchewan	Manitoba
Women Team Compound	Manitoba	Quebec	British Columbia
Men Recurve Individual	(Quebec) Patrick-Rivest Bunster	(Alberta) Lael Barlow	(Ontario) John-David Burnes
Women Recurve Individual	(Quebec) Kristel Alain	(New Brunswick) Christina Galloway	(Alberta) Kelsey Davidson
Men Team Recurve	Alberta	Ontario	Saskatchewan
Women's Team Recurve	Alberta	Manitoba	Saskatchewan

== Artistic gymnastics ==
Event	Gold	Silver	Bronze
Men's Team Competition	British Columbia	Alberta	Ontario
Women's Team Competition	Quebec	British Columbia	Ontario
Men's Floor Exercise	(Ontario) Kevin Lytwyn	(Ontario) Matt Lubrick	(Saskatchewan) Jayd Michal J. Lukencuk
Men's Pummel Horse	(British Columbia) Alexander Hoy	(Quebec) Gabriel Boucher	(Saskatchewan) Anderson Loran
Men's Rings	(Saskatchewan) Jayd Michal J. Lukencuk	(Ontario) Kevin Lytwyn	(British Columbia) Danny Chambers
Men's Vault	(Ontario) Kevin Lytwyn	(Saskatchewan) Jayd Michal J. Lukencuk	(Nova Scotia) Liam James Hawkins
Men's Parallel Bars	(Saskatchewan) Jayd Michal J. Lukencuk	(British Columbia) Alexander Hoy	(Ontario) Kevin Lytwyn
Men's Horizontal Bar	(British Columbia) Spencer Dear	(Ontario) Kevin Lytwyn	(Alberta) Jackson Payne
Women's Floor Exercise	(British Columbia) Alycia Chan	(Ontario) Amanda Fuller	(British Columbia) Nicole Pineau
Women's Vault	(Ontario) Dominique Pegg	(British Columbia) Hannah Karina Swift	(British Columbia) Alycia Maria Chan
Women's Uneven Bars	(British Columbia) Brittany Rogers	(Quebec) Mélissa Corbo	(Quebec) Marion Potvin
Women's Beam	(British Columbia) Brittany Rogers	(Alberta) Kelsey Lang	(Ontario) Nicole Heikkila

== Badminton ==
Event	Gold	Silver	Bronze
Men's Singles	(Quebec) Mathieu Laforest	(British Columbia) Chris Ho Ming Lee	(British Columbia) Richard Liang
Women's Singles	(Ontario) Joycelyn Ko	(Ontario) Jennifer Y. Lam	(Quebec) Isabelle Louise Mercier-Dalphon
Men's Doubles	(Quebec) Laforest/Laforest	(Alberta) Hilland/Mullaly	(British Columbia) Ng/Lau
Women's Doubles	(Ontario) Ko/Ko	(British Columbia) Liang/Man	(Quebec) Lavoi/Mercier-Dalphon
Mixed Doubles	(British Columbia) Ng/Liang	(British Columbia) Lau/Yeung	(British Columbia) Ma/Chan

== Biathlon ==
Event	Gold	Silver	Bronze
Junior Men's Relay	Alberta	Quebec	Manitoba
Junior Women's Relay	Alberta	Quebec	Manitoba
Junior Men's Sprint	(Alberta) Tyson Smith	(Alberta) Andrew Charles Fagan	(Quebec) Yannick Letailleur
Junior Women's Sprint	(Alberta) Rosanna Crawford	(Alberta) Jessica Sedlock	(Quebec) Claude Godbout
Junior Men's Individual	(Alberta) Tyson Smith	(Quebec) Maxime Leboeuf	(Alberta) Yannick Letailleur
Junior Women's Individual	(Alberta) Rosanna Crawford	(Quebec) Claude Godbout	(Manitoba) Megan Imrie
Pursuit	CANCELLED		

== Boxing ==
=== Medal summary ===
Event	Gold	Silver	Bronze
Light flyweight	(Quebec) François Pratte	(Saskatchewan) Chris Fiacco	
Flyweight	(New Brunswick) Dominic Babineau	(British Columbia) Kenny Singh Lally	(Ontario) Jermaine Ricardo Badchkam
Flyweight	(New Brunswick) Dominic Babineau	(British Columbia) Kenny Singh Lally	(Manitoba) Vincent Jonathan Brian Morden
Bantamweight	(Quebec) Chris Plaitis	(Manitoba) Jesse Aaron Thomas Larabie	(New Brunswick) Mathew Kevin Donald Good
Bantamweight	(Quebec) Chris Plaitis	(Manitoba) Jesse Aaron Thomas Larabie	(Alberta) Mellad Rahimee
Featherweight	(Quebec) Kenny Lamoureux	(Ontario) Steven Ross Wilcox	(Alberta) Alexander Mitchell Rose
Featherweight	(Quebec) Kenny Lamoureux	(Ontario) Steven Ross Wilcox	(Manitoba) Zafar Sacranie
Lightweight	(Ontario) Zishan Sayyed Khan	(Quebec) Jean-Philippe Cyr	(Manitoba) River Shea Davidson
Lightweight	(Ontario) Zishan Sayyed Khan	(Quebec) Jean-Philippe Cyr	(British Columbia) Michael Singh Nagra
Light welterweight	(Ontario) Joshua Duncan Cameron	(Newfoundland and Labrador) Mponda Kalunga-loksa	(Nova Scotia) Brody Robert Blair
Light welterweight	(Ontario) Joshua Duncan Cameron	(Newfoundland and Labrador) Mponda Kalunga-loksa	(Quebec) Mikaël Zewski
Welterweight	(Quebec) Daniel Jr. Désorcy	(Saskatchewan) Stuart Vincent Twardzik	(Nova Scotia) Michael David Gerrow
Welterweight	(Quebec) Daniel Jr. Désorcy	(Saskatchewan) Stuart Vincent Twardzik	(Ontario) Jordan Taylor Letestu
Middleweight	(Ontario) Jerome Garnet Gabriel	(Alberta) Andrew Ronald Graham	(Nova Scotia) Sonny Gerald McLellan
Middleweight	(Ontario) Jerome Garnet Gabriel	(Alberta) Andrew Ronald Graham	(British Columbia) Tommy Szikinger
Light heavyweight	(Quebec) Alexandre Beaupré-Tremblay	(Nova Scotia) Cameron Victor Howatt	(British Columbia) Korbin Trent Nikolai
Light heavyweight	(Quebec) Alexandre Beaupré-Tremblay	(Nova Scotia) Cameron Victor Howatt	(Alberta) Robert Michael Sherman
Heavyweight	(Quebec) Simon Kean	(British Columbia) Mike Neil Cartwright	(Alberta) Kody Peter Fahlman
Heavyweight	(Quebec) Simon Kean	(British Columbia) Mike Neil Cartwright	(Ontario) Kyle David Michal Matuk

== Cross-country skiing ==
Event	Gold	Silver	Bronze
Men's Relay	Ontario	Alberta	British Columbia
Women's Relay	Alberta	Ontario	Yukon
Men's 1200m Sprint	(British Columbia) Christopher Lyle Werrell	(Quebec) Nicolas Poirier	(British Columbia) Cameron Patrick Egan
Women's 1200m Sprint	(Alberta) Cathy Jaques	(Alberta) Heidi Andrea Widmer	(Alberta) Marlis Yvonne Kromm
Men's Race (Classic, interval)	(Yukon) David William Lane Greer	(Alberta) Curtis Sunil Merry	(Alberta) Graeme Wesley Killick
Women's Race (Classic, interval)	(Alberta) Marcia Rita Birkigt	(British Columbia) Alysson Flora Marshall	(Yukon) Jennifer Bryn Knight
Men's Race (Free, mass start)	(Northwest Territories) Brendan Green	(Ontario) Gavin Michael Hamilton	(Alberta) Curtis Sunil Merry
Women's Race (Free, mass start)	(British Columbia) Alysson Flora Marshall	(Alberta) Marlis Yvonne Kromm	(Ontario) Alana Jane Deakin Thomas

== Curling ==
Event	Gold	Silver	Bronze
Women's	Ontario; Rachel Homan; Lynn Kreviazuk; Emma Miskew; Jamie Sinclair	Manitoba; April Jorgensen; Katie Kruk; Roslynn Ripley; Lorelle Weiss	British Columbia; Simone Brosseau; Caitlin Davidson; Melissa Moen; Samantha Van Iperen
Men's	Alberta; Tyler Edward Bennett; Travis Andrew Guynup; Colin Sterling-Wyatt Hodgson; Joel William Otto Peterman	Ontario; Mathew Robert Camm; Andrew Gordon Hamilton; Graham Alan Rathwell; Neil Patrick Sinclair	Prince Edward Island; Anson James Carmody; Adam Adrian Casey; Brett Gallant; Alex Gordon MacFadyen

== Fencing ==
=== Medal summary ===
==== Men's events ====
Event	Gold	Silver	Bronze
Épée	(Quebec) Mikael Lambert	(Ontario) Karl Sebastian Gardner	(Quebec) Guillaume Rodrigue
Épée	(Quebec) Mikael Lambert	(Ontario) Karl Sebastian Gardner	(Ontario) John Garn Wright
Team épée	Quebec; Guillaume Hugo Drouin Garneau; Mikael Lambert; Guillaume Rodrigue	Ontario; Karl Sebastian Gardner; Jonathan Stapleton Hutchinson; John Garn Wright	New Brunswick; Jack William Corey; Patrick David Craig; Christopher Michael Reid
Foil	(Alberta) Anthony James Prymack	(Alberta) Sinatrio Raharjo	(Quebec) Nitai Ben-Shach
Foil	(Alberta) Anthony James Prymack	(Alberta) Sinatrio Raharjo	(Ontario) Alecsandruio Ionel Tudor
Team foil	Alberta; Sam Francis Hardwicke-Brown; Anthony James Prymack; Sinatrio Raharjo	Quebec; Nitai Ben-Shach; Laurent Dumouchel; Gabriel Gélinas	Ontario; Simon Gregory Cheesman-Francis; Sean McKay; Alecsandruio Ionel Tudor
Sabre	(Quebec) Vincent Couturier	(Manitoba) Max Stearns	(Quebec) Nicolas Beaulieu
Sabre	(Quebec) Vincent Couturier	(Manitoba) Max Stearns	(Quebec) Joseph Polossifakis
Team sabre	Quebec; Nicolas Beaulieu; Vincent Couturier; Joseph Polossifakis	Manitoba; Zacharie Jon Allard; Max Stearns; Colin Garhardt Weinheimer	Alberta; Paul Almaev; Andrew Gergely; Eric Alexander Goldie

==== Women's events ====
Event	Gold	Silver	Bronze
Épée	(Manitoba) Gillian Turnbull	(Quebec) Laurence Beaulieu-Carbonneau	(Saskatchewan) Neaera Emmaline Deptuch
Épée	(Manitoba) Gillian Turnbull	(Quebec) Laurence Beaulieu-Carbonneau	(Ontario) Adelaide Edith McDonnell
Team épée	Alberta; Alanna Clare Bowie; Kinga Kovacs; Karis Nicole Langvand	Quebec; Laurence Beaulieu-Carbonneau; Éléna Drouin; Gabrielle Tetrault	Ontario; Isabelle D. Gauthier; Adelaide Edith McDonnell; Casey Rose Remmer
Foil	(Ontario) Alexandra Frances Lyn	(Quebec) Anissa Khelfaoui	(Ontario) Jennifer Ann Klowak
Foil	(Ontario) Alexandra Frances Lyn	(Quebec) Anissa Khelfaoui	(Quebec) Alexandrine Morency
Team foil	Quebec; Laurence Charlebois-Dupuis; Anissa Khelfaoui; Alexandrine Morency	Ontario; Jennifer Dean Dunev; Jennifer Ann Klowak; Alexandra Frances Lyn	Saskatchewan; Paule Sebastiane Bertholet; Meagan Breanne Dagg; Aimee Danielle Schryer
Sabre	(Quebec) Frédéric Chevarie	(Quebec) Alessandra Magini	(Quebec) Camille Bernard
Sabre	(Quebec) Frédéric Chevarie	(Quebec) Alessandra Magini	(Ontario) Kayla Beth Lambie
Team sabre	Quebec; Camille Bernard; Frédéric Chevarie; Alessandra Magini	Alberta; Olga Guintchitskaia; Rhiannon Myfanwy Kirkland; Elyse Anne Richards	Ontario; Becca Howes; Kayla Beth Lambie; Adrienne Maria Sukunda

== Figure skating ==
Event	Gold	Silver	Bronze
Men's Pre-Novice Singles	(British Columbia) Liam Firus	(Alberta) Stuart Raymond Ure	(British Columbia) Rhys Thomas Anderson
Women's Pre-Novice Singles	(Ontario) Alexandra Najarro	(British Columbia) Cambria Jacklyn Little	(Newfoundland and Labrador) Kaetlyn Osmond
Mixed Pre-Novice Pair	(Ontario) Ian Steven Beharry / Zoey Brown	(Quebec) Luca Olivier Frappier Charron / Nadia Carlone	(Newfoundland and Labrador) Matthew James Young / Alexandra Catherine Young
Mixed Pre-Novice Dance	(Ontario) Ryan James Behnia / Lisa Casselman	(Quebec) Benjamin Edward Arcieri / Raphaëlle Claudia Viau	(British Columbia) Jason Michael Cheperdak / Elizabeth Lynne Hadwell
Men's Novice Singles	(Ontario) Andrei Rogozine	(Quebec) Louis-Philippe Sirois	(Saskatchewan) Brandon Joseph Prete
Women's Novice Singles	(Ontario) Kirsten Leigh Moore-Towers	(British Columbia) Rika Inoda	(Quebec) Vanessa Grenier
Mixed Novice Pairs	(Quebec) Jeremy Sandor / Sara Marie Jones	(Ontario) Paul Michel Messner / Brittany Lynn Jones	(British Columbia) Mitchell Robert Andrew Wallace / Ivana Katerina Hecimovic
Mixed Novice Dance	(Ontario) Andrew William Doleman / Maja Leanna Vermeulen	(Quebec) Jonathan William Arcieri / Kim Poudrier	(Manitoba) Martin Andre Nickel / Tamiko Ruby Uyeda
Men's Special Olympics Level II Singles	(British Columbia) Walter Reddecliff	(New Brunswick) Fraser Joseph Walsh	(Alberta) Rodney Dalessio
Women's Special Olympics Level II Singles	(Saskatchewan) Gwen Hochlander	(Quebec) Annie Boulanger	(Ontario) Jessica Margaret Anne Young
Men's Special Olympics Level III Singles	(Quebec) Zane Salera-Nasra	(Saskatchewan) Justin Man Duong	(Quebec) Simon Dionne
Women's Special Olympics Level III Singles	(Alberta) Kennedy Reanne Zaytsoff	(Saskatchewan) Kathryn Brianna Durant	(Ontario) Carlea Wilkie-Ellis

== Freestyle skiing ==
Event	Gold	Silver	Bronze
Men's Half Pipe	(Alberta) Michael James Henitiuk	(British Columbia) Matt Jacob Margetts	(British Columbia) Dean Michael Kappler
Women's Half Pipe	(Alberta) Carly McClelland	(Ontario) Gillian McIvor	(Alberta) Megan Bilton
Men's Moguls	(Quebec) Cedric Rachon	(Quebec) Marc-Antoine Gagnon	(British Columbia) Tim Scott Crosby
Women's Moguls	(Quebec) Chloé Dufour-Lapointe	(Quebec) Alexandra Ann Dufresne	(British Columbia) Sarah Jane Hogg
Men's Dual Moguls	(Alberta) Michael James Henitiuk	(Quebec) Marc-Antoine Gagnon	(Quebec) Cedric Rochon
Women's Dual Moguls	(Quebec) Chloé Dufour-Lapointe	(Ontario) Kylie Ann Sivell	(Ontario) Gillian C. Connelly McIver
Men's Aerials	(Quebec) Olivier Rochon	(British Columbia) Matt Jacob Margetts	(British Columbia) Andrew Donovan Pool
Women's Aerials	(Alberta) Keltie Diane Hansen	(Ontario) Gillian Christine Connelly McIver	(Ontario) Kylie Ann Sivell

== Ice hockey ==
Event	Gold	Silver	Bronze
Men's	Ontario	Manitoba	Alberta
Women's	Ontario	Manitoba	Quebec

== Judo ==
=== Men ===
Event	Gold	Silver	Bronze
51 kg	(Ontario) Nick Zakharov	(British Columbia) Miguel Luciano de Sousa	(Quebec) Dominique Côté
51 kg	(Ontario) Nick Zakharov	(British Columbia) Miguel Luciano de Sousa	(Saskatchewan) Kendal Boyd McArthur
55 kg	(Ontario) David Ancor	(British Columbia) Layton Daniel Keely	(Quebec) Maxime Sébastien Castonguay
55 kg	(Ontario) David Ancor	(British Columbia) Layton Daniel Keely	(Alberta) Thomas Gordon Okamura
60 kg	(Quebec) Sergio Pessoa	(Nova Scotia) Matthew James Vaughan	(Ontario) Mark William Welsh
60 kg	(Quebec) Sergio Pessoa	(Nova Scotia) Matthew James Vaughan	(Alberta) Serge Zamotine
66 kg	(Quebec) Jean-Philippe Gagnon	(Ontario) Darcy Brandon Reis	(New Brunswick) André-Pierre Sylvain Bossé
66 kg	(Quebec) Jean-Philippe Gagnon	(Ontario) Darcy Brandon Reis	(Alberta) Stefane Prosper Cam Truong
73 kg	(Quebec) Corey Alexander Paquette	(Ontario) Lukasz Mozdzen	(New Brunswick) Rene-Pierre Sebastien Bossé
73 kg	(Quebec) Corey Alexander Paquette	(Ontario) Lukasz Mozdzen	(British Columbia) Scott Fraser McGrandle
81 kg	(Quebec) Antoine Valois-Fortier	(Ontario) Jakub Jan Graczyk	(Manitoba) Maxime Kharitonov
81 kg	(Quebec) Antoine Valois-Fortier	(Ontario) Jakub Jan Graczyk	(Saskatchewan) Dylan Drew Webber
90 kg	(Quebec) Alexandre-Nicholas Rodriguez-Vigouroux	(Manitoba) Michael Shem Leger	(Alberta) Sean Russell Helstein
90 kg	(Quebec) Alexandre-Nicholas Rodriguez-Vigouroux	(Manitoba) Michael Shem Leger	(British Columbia) Christopher Norman Gilbert Wass
100 kg	(Quebec) Andrew Goulet	(Ontario) Nedjo Sarenac	(Manitoba) Anson William Pops
100 kg	(Quebec) Andrew Goulet	(Ontario) Nedjo Sarenac	(British Columbia) Stefan Alexander Zwiers
Over 100 kg	(Prince Edward Island) Paul Patrick Knox	(Quebec) Éric Gauthier	(Nunavut) Eugene Dederick
Over 100 kg	(Prince Edward Island) Paul Patrick Knox	(Quebec) Éric Gauthier	(Manitoba) Matty Jonathan Zebrasky

=== Women ===
Event	Gold	Silver	Bronze
44 kg	(Saskatchewan) Jordan Poliakiwski	(British Columbia) Jessica Leanne Mah	(Ontario) Andrea Madgett
48 kg	(Ontario) Jade Parsons	(British Columbia) Nicole Allison Edlund	(Quebec) Alice Cloutier
48 kg	(Ontario) Jade Parsons	(British Columbia) Nicole Allison Edlund	(Prince Edward Island) Alicia Marie Wilbert
52 kg	(Ontario) Renee M. Guggino	(Quebec) Joëlle Couture-Légaré	(New Brunswick) Myriam Fortin
52 kg	(Ontario) Renee M. Guggino	(Quebec) Joëlle Couture-Légaré	(Alberta) Nicole Atsumi Tsukishima
57 kg	(Quebec) Maude-Hélène Benoît	(British Columbia) Mackenzie Lauren Cupp	(Ontario) Stephanie Loretta Lampman
57 kg	(Quebec) Maude-Hélène Benoît	(British Columbia) Mackenzie Lauren Cupp	(New Brunswick) Amy Elizabeth Merry
63 kg	(New Brunswick) Myriam Lamarche	(Manitoba) Cynthia Kelpin	(Ontario) Chelcie Kathleen Doherty
63 kg	(New Brunswick) Myriam Lamarche	(Manitoba) Cynthia Kelpin	(Quebec) Anne-Marie Pettersen
70 kg	(British Columbia) Ashley Maria Bartlett	(Quebec) Marie-Ève De Villers-Matte	(Ontario) Yacinta Xuân Nguyen-Huu
70 kg	(British Columbia) Ashley Maria Bartlett	(Quebec) Marie-Ève De Villers-Matte	(Yukon) Amber Dawn Saunders
78 kg	(British Columbia) Rebecca Pretious	(Saskatchewan) Bethany Jane Stever	(Prince Edward Island) Carrie Nicole Callahan
78 kg	(British Columbia) Rebecca Pretious	(Saskatchewan) Bethany Jane Stever	(Quebec) Renée-Claude Liliane Roussel
Over 78 kg	(Manitoba) Alyssa Victoria Caughy	(Ontario) Adriana Nicoleta Fierastrau	(Quebec) Véronique Ménard

=== Team competition ===
Event	Gold	Silver	Bronze
Men's	Quebec	British Columbia	Manitoba
Women's	Quebec	Ontario	British Columbia

== Ringette ==
Event	Gold	Silver	Bronze
Women's	Ontario	Alberta	Quebec

== Shooting ==
Event	Gold	Silver	Bronze
Men's Team Air Pistol	Quebec	Saskatchewan	Ontario
Women's Team Air Pistol	British Columbia	Ontario	Alberta
Men's Individual Air Pistol	(Saskatchewan) Matthew James Hendry	(British Columbia) Tyler Bryce Johnson	(Saskatchewan) Samuel Pidwerbeski
Women's Individual Air Pistol	(British Columbia) Catherine Thwaites	(British Columbia) Silvia Lydia Incrocci	(Saskatchewan) Christine Elizabeth King
Men's Team Air Rifle	British Columbia	Saskatchewan	Ontario
Women's Team Air Rifle	Saskatchewan	Ontario	British Columbia
Men's Individual Air Rifle	(Saskatchewan) Matthew William McDermott	(Saskatchewan) Justin David Nenson	(Ontario) Michael Wade Goodchild
Women's Individual Air Rifle	(British Columbia) Rauchelle Nicole Johnson	(British Columbia) Kaitlyn Sasanne Harvey	(Saskatchewan) Connor Elizabeth Deneka

== Snowboarding (exhibition) ==
=== Parallel giant slalom ===
Medal	Men	Women
Gold	(Alberta) Daniel Haines	(Ontario) Marianne Leeson
Silver	(Ontario) Curt Rohm	(Quebec) Justin Cote
Bronze	(Alberta) Thomas Snarr	(Ontario) Rachel Merry
4	(Nova Scotia) Jamie Gilhen	(Quebec) Meghan Patrick
5	(Ontario) Matthew Carter	(Alberta) Paige Seabrooke
6	(Quebec) Sebastien Beaulieu	(British Columbia) Carly Thorp
7	(Nova Scotia) Devon Chandler	(Nova Scotia) Kita McRory
8	(Quebec) Frederic Laurin-Lalonde	(Alberta) Katie Areshenko

== Speed skating ==
=== Long track ===
Event	Gold	Silver	Bronze
Men's 100 m	(Quebec) Camille Bégin	(Alberta) Lucas Duffield	(Saskatchewan) William Dutton
Women's 100 m	(Saskatchewan) Marsha Hudey	(Alberta) Alanna Komisar	(Manitoba) Shayla Heidinger
Men's 500 m	(Ontario) Richard MacLennan	(Saskatchewan) Austin Hudey	(Ontario) Patrick Marsh
Women's 500 m	(Saskatchewan) Marsha Hudey	(Alberta) Anastasia Bucsis	(Quebec) Michèle Boutin
Women's 1000 m	(Quebec) Marie-Pier Gervais-Moreau	(Manitoba) Shayla Heidinger	(Ontario) Maddie Martin
Men's 1500 m	(Alberta) Keith Sulzer	(Alberta) Lucas Duffield	(Ontario) Spencer Zettler
Women's 1500 m	(Ontario) Maddie Martin	(Saskatchewan) Kali Christ	(Quebec) Marie-Pier Gervais-Moreau
Men's 3000 m	(Quebec) Clovis Auger	(Alberta) Keith Sulzer	(Manitoba) Kyle Gendron
Women's 3000 m	(Ontario) Maddie Martin	(Manitoba) Andrea Johnson	(Quebec) Marie-Pier Gervais-Moreau
Men's 5000 m	(Quebec) Clovis Auger	(Alberta) Keith Sulzer	(Manitoba) Kyle Gendron
Men's Team Pursuit	Quebec	Alberta	British Columbia
Women's Team Pursuit	Saskatchewan	Ontario	Manitoba

=== Short track ===
Event	Gold	Silver	Bronze
Men's 500 m	(Quebec) Guillaume Blais-Dufour	(Quebec) Vincent André	(Ontario) Nicolas Bean
Women's 500 m	(Quebec) Marianne St-Gelais	(Quebec) Valérie Lambert	(Quebec) Valérie Maltais
Men's 1000 m	(Ontario) Nicolas Bean	(Quebec) Guillaume Blais-Dufour	(Quebec) Maxime Fortin
Women's 1000 m	(Quebec) Marianne St-Gelais	(Ontario) Ivanie Blondin	(Quebec) Valérie Maltais
Men's 1500 m	(Ontario) Nicolas Bean	(Quebec) Guillaume Blais-Dufour	(Alberta) Steve James Buzinski
Women's 1500 m	(Ontario) Ivanie Blondin	(Quebec) Marianne St-Gelais	(Quebec) Andrea Anh Do-Duc
Men's 3000 m	(Quebec) Guillaume Blais-Dufour	(Ontario) Nicolas Bean	(Quebec) Mathieu Richer
Women's 3000 m	(Quebec) Marianne St-Gelais	(Quebec) Valérie Maltais	(Alberta) Gillian Sarah Rachel Richmond
Men's 3000 m Relay	Quebec	Ontario	New Brunswick
Women's 3000 m Relay	Quebec	Ontario	New Brunswick

== Squash ==
Event	Gold	Silver	Bronze
Men's	Ontario; Colin Richard West; Christopher Sachvie; Brian William Hong; Nick Sachvie	Alberta; David Michael Letourneau; Graeme Dobson Schnell; Eliot Francis Linklater; Dustin Michael Brian Paisley	British Columbia; Ryan Andrew Paul Herden; Thomas Jerald Brinkman; Rafik Shams Bhaloo; Mac Phillipe Foster
Women's	Ontario; Laura Christine Gemmell; Rebecca Dundon Hazell; Carly Ann Hong; Samantha Cornett	Alberta; Jackie Elizabeth Louise Moss; Erika Natalie Dort; Jaime Michelle Laird; Kelsey Laurin Tole	British Columbia; Sarah Parsons; Nikki Sequeira; Kristen Andrea Iverson; Rachel Au

== Synchronised swimming ==
=== Medal summary ===
Event	Gold	Silver	Bronze
Women's Figures			
Women's Solo	(Quebec) Camille Bowness	(Ontario) Samantha Mawhinney	(Saskatchewan) Jessica Guenther
Women's Duet	(Quebec) Camille Bowness / Marie-Lou Morin	(Ontario) Katherine LePage / Chelsey Matthews	(Alberta) Emily Brooks / Maria Friesen
Women's Team	Quebec; Laurie-Anne Bédard; Gabrielle Bernier; Camille Bowness; Stéphanie Durocher; Jo-Annie Melina Fortin; Stéphanie Leclair; Marie-Lou Morin; Catherine Anne Powell; Alice Rijer	Ontario; Alyssa Rochelle Bezeau; Samantha Kowalski; Katherine Anne LePage; Julia Kristine Maclean; Chelsey Joyce Matthews; Samantha Lianne Mawhinney; Victoria Ellyse Mintz; Annette Shauna Petersen; Stephanie Marie Saunders	Alberta; Nicola Danielle Allen; Hannah Chambers Bazar; Emily Janet Brooks; Savannah Makena Forrester; Maria Claire Friesen; Katherine Diane Scott; Braley Marie Traub; Emily Marjorie Frances Whalen

== Table tennis ==
=== Medal summary ===
Event	Gold	Silver	Bronze
Junior Men's under-15 singles	(British Columbia) Andre Ho	(Quebec) Arnaud Roche-Nadon	(Manitoba) Terry (Tian) Zhang
Junior Men's under-18 singles	(Quebec) Ling Kun Yang	(Quebec) Bryan Michaud	(Manitoba) Frederick Ming Fat Eng
Junior Women's under-15 singles	(British Columbia) Peggy Pei-yi Hsien	(Quebec) Éloïse Garnier-St-Aubin	(Ontario) Yuri Chu Su
Junior Women's under-18 singles	(British Columbia) Carmen Lee	(Alberta) Hannah Li	(Ontario) Tracy Yuen
Junior Mix	British Columbia	Quebec	Alberta

== Wheelchair basketball ==
=== Mixed Mix ===
Gold	Silver	Bronze
Quebec	Ontario	Saskatchewan
