= Taras Shelestyuk =

Ukrainian boxer (born 1985)

Taras Shelestiuk
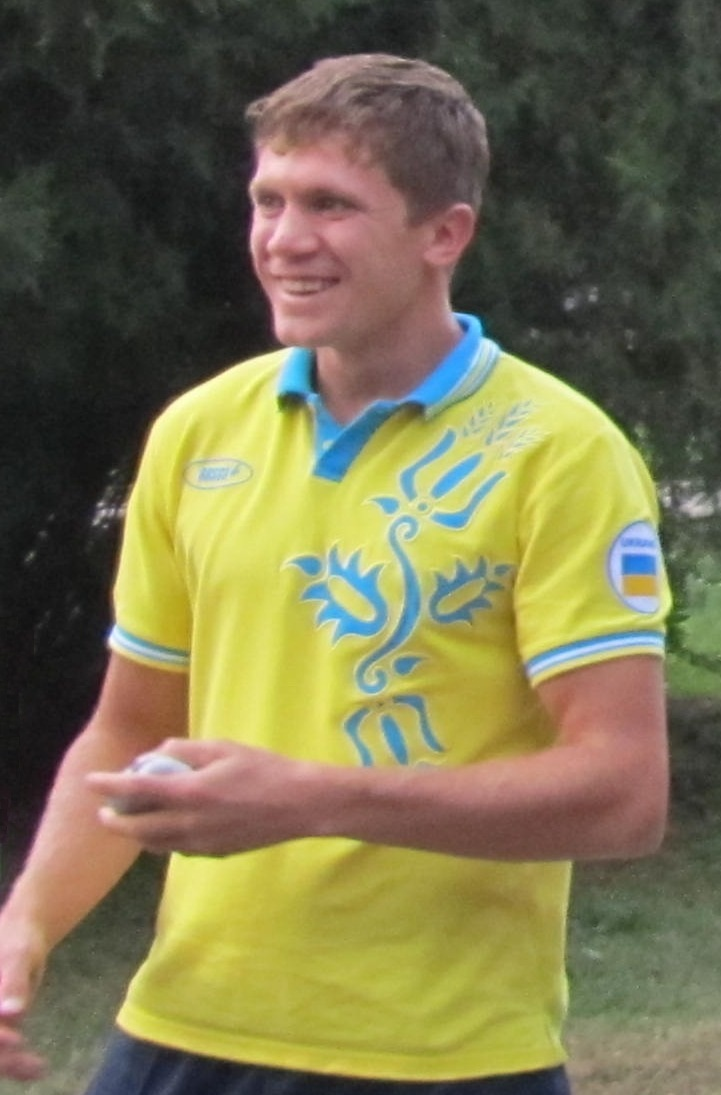
- Taras Shelestyuk in 2012

Personal information
- Nationality: Ukraine
- Born: Taras Shelestiuk; Тарас Олександрович Шелестюк; November 30, 1985 (age 40) Makiivka, Ukrainian SSR, USSR
- Height: 1.79 m (5 ft 10 1/2 in)
- Weight: Welterweight

Boxing career

Boxing record
- Total fights: 23
- Wins: 22
- Win by KO: 12
- Losses: 0
- Draws: 1
Medal record
Olympic Games
Bronze medal – third place	2012 London	Welterweight
World Amateur Championships
Gold medal – first place	2011 Baku	Welterweight
European Amateur Championships
Bronze medal – third place	2010 Moscow	Welterweight

Taras Oleksandrovych Shelestyuk (Ukrainian: Тарас Олександрович Шелестюк; born 30 November 1985) is a Ukrainian undefeated professional boxer. His professional record 19-0-1 with 11 knockouts. He trained by legendary boxing trainer Freddie Roach from 2013 to 2015. Taras Shelestyuk won the gold medal at welterweight division (69 kg / 152 lb) at the 2011 World Amateur Boxing Championships in Baku and became the second boxer in independent Ukraine to win the World amateur Championship. He also won a Bronze medal at Olympic Games in London 2012.

== Professional career ==
In the final of 2011 World Championships, he beat Serik Sapiyev from Kazakhstan after 3 rounds with 16–10 final score (5:2, 3:2, 8:6 per round). Prior to the final, beating his opponents from Denmark, Cuba, France and Russia respectively, he qualified for 2012 Summer Olympics by reaching the quarter finals. Along with his contribution, Ukraine Boxing National Team have topped the 2011 World Amateur Boxing Championship overall medal table with 4 gold and 1 silver medals. Additionally, climbing up 20 ladders, Shelestyuk captured the top spot at AIBA individual rankings with 1700 points, as of 31 October 2011, in front of Welsh Freddie Evans and Indian Vikas Krishan. Getting the Bronze medal in Olympic Games in London 2012 he moved to Los Angeles and signed a contract with a promotion company and turned professional. Now training at famous boxing gym "Wild Card boxing club" with trainer Freddie Roach.

=== Highlights ===
2011 World Championships
Event	Round	Result	Opponent	Score
Welterweight	First	Win	(Denmark) Torben Keller	23–8
Welterweight	Second	Win	(Cuba) Carlos Banteurt	17–15
Welterweight	Third	Win	(France) Alexis Vastine	18–11
Welterweight	Quarterfinal	Win	(Russia) Andrey Zamkovoy	(+)13–13
Welterweight	Semifinal	Win	(India) Vikas Krishan	15–12
Welterweight	Final	Win	(Kazakhstan) Serik Sapiyev	16–10

2010 European Championships
Event	Round	Result	Opponent	Score
Welterweight	First	Win	(Russia) Andrey Zamkovoy	6–3
Welterweight	Second	Win	(Turkey) Önder Şipal	4–2
Welterweight	Quarterfinal	Win	(Republic of Ireland) John Joe Joyce	9–1
Welterweight	Semifinal	Loss	(Hungary) Balazs Bacskai	2–4

== Professional boxing record ==
22 wins (12 knockouts), 0 losses, 1 draws
Res.	Record	Opponent	Type	Round	Date	Location	Notes
Win	22–0–1	(Venezuela) Andres Munoz	UD	10 (10)	2026-08-09	(Venezuela) Manta, Ecuador	Won vacant WBO Inter-Continental welterweight title
Win	21–0–1	(Venezuela) Anthony Saez	UD	10 (10)	2025-11-08	(Venezuela) Coliseo Julio Cesar Hidalgo, Quito, Ecuador	
Win	20–0–1	(United States) Roddricus Livsey	KO	2 (10)	2025-07-05	(United States) Sam's Town Casino, Shreveport, Louisiana, U.S.	
Draw	19–0–1	(Venezuela) Gabriel Maestre	SD	10	2022-03-11	Montreal Casino, Montreal, Canada	
Win	19–0	(Venezuela) Ernesto Espana	TKO	10 (10)	2021-10-16	Oasis Hotel Complex, Cancun, Mexico	
Win	18–0	(Argentina) Luis Alberto Veron	UD	10	2020-01-31	(United States) Hirsch Coliseum, Shreveport, Louisiana, U.S.	
Win	17–0	(Mexico) Martin Angel Martinez	UD	8	2019-03-09	(United States) Doubletree Hotel, Ontario, California, U.S.	
Win	16–0	(Mexico) Jesus Alvarez Rodriguez	KO	3 (8)	2017-07-01	(United States) Omega Products International, Sacramento, California, U.S.	
Win	15–0	(United States) Jaime Herrera	UD	10	2016-11-04	(United States) Omega Products International, Corona, California, U.S.	Won WBO NABO welterweight title
Win	14–0	(Mexico) Erick Daniel Martinez	RTD	3 (8)	2016-05-20	(United States) Doubletree Hotel, Ontario, California, U.S.	
Win	13–0	(Russia) Aslanbek Kozaev	UD	10	2015-11-06	(United States) The D Hotel & Casino, Las Vegas, Nevada, U.S.	Won vacant WBA Inter-Continental welterweight title. Won vacant WBO NABO welterweight title
Win	12–0	(United States) Juan Rodriguez Jr	UD	8	2015-04-03	(United States) Omega Products International, Corona, California, U.S.	
Win	11–0	(Mexico) Francisco Javier Reza	TKO	3 (8)	2015-02-20	(United States) Doubletree Hotel, Ontario, California, U.S.	
Win	10–0	(United States) Antonio Chaves Fernandez	KO	1 (8)	2015-01-16	(United States) Turning Stone Resort & Casino, Verona, New York, U.S.	
Win	9–0	(United States) Patrick Boozer	SD	8	2014-09-26	(United States) Doubletree Hotel, Ontario, California, U.S.	
Win	8–0	(United States) Romon Barber	TKO	1 (6)	2014-03-28	(United States) Four Bears Casino & Lodge, New Town, North Dakota, U.S.	
Win	7–0	(Mexico) Francisco Flores	TKO	1 (4)	2014-02-21	(United States) Edgewater Hotel & Casino, Laughlin, Nevada, U.S.	
Win	6–0	(United States) Thomas Allen	TKO	2 (6)	2013-11-15	(United States) Prairie Meadows Track & Casino, Altoona, Iowa, U.S.	
Win	5–0	(United States) Adam Ealoms	UD	4	2013-07-26	(United States) Thunder Valley Casino Resort, Lincoln, California, U.S.	
Win	4–0	(United States) Travis Hanshaw	UD	4	2013-06-28	(United States) Veteran's Coliseum, Jacksonville, Florida, U.S.	
Win	3–0	(Mexico) Mario Angeles	TKO	2 (4)	2013-05-17	(United States) Doubletree Hotel, Ontario, California, U.S.	
Win	2–0	(United States) Brandon Adams	TKO	4 (4)	2013-05-02	(United States) Omega Products International, Corona, California, U.S.	
Win	1–0	(United States) Kamal Muhammad	TKO	1 (4)	2013-03-29	(United States) Turning Stone Resort & Casino, Verona, New York, U.S.	Professional debut

== See also ==
- 2011 World Amateur Boxing Championships
- 2010 European Amateur Boxing Championships
