= Iain Weaver =

English boxer (born 1990)

Personal information
- Nationality: British
- Born: 17 January 1990 (age 36) Ferndown
- Weight: Featherweight 57kg

Boxing career

Boxing record
- Total fights: 115
- Wins: 95
- Losses: 20
Medal record
2010 Commonwealth Boxing Championships
Gold medal – first place	2010 New Delhi	Featherweight
2010 European Amateur Boxing Championships
Silver medal – second place	2010 Moscow	Featherweight

Iain Weaver (born 17 January 1990) is an English professional boxer who turned professional in May 2012. Prior to turning professional he was fighting in the 57 kg Featherweight category. He was a member of the England elite squad as well as the Great British podium squad and won silver at the 2010 European Amateur Boxing Championships in Moscow. Gold at commonwealths games India. Weaver turned professional having not been given the chance at Olympic qualifiers for GB Olympic Squad for the 2012 Summer Olympics in London.

== Amateur career ==
Weaver boxed for Golden Ring ABC in Southampton and was a member of the Great Britain elite squad trained by Robert McCracken and funded with money from the National Lottery. As a junior Weaver won two junior ABA titles in 2007 and 2008 he was also the Great Britain three nations gold medalist in the same years. He won the 2009 Amateur Boxing Association British featherweight title, when boxing out of the Golden Ring ABC.

=== European championships ===
Weaver booked his place in the team for the 2010 Commonwealth Games in Delhi with a silver medal at the 2010 European Championships in Moscow. En route to the final Weaver had defeated the Spaniard Rodrigues Molina 11–3 in the 1st round, Sweden's Bashir Hassan-Salad 8–3 in the second and the Frenchman Oualid Belaoura in the quarter-finals. A win over Ireland's Tyrone McCullagh in the semi-final set him up for a shot at Germany's Denis Makarov in the final only for him to come undone by the Germans counter punching skills. The performance of Weaver at the championships drew praise from McCracken the head coach who claimed that the success of the younger boxers such as Weaver in Moscow would send out a positive message to the rest of the team. Weavers success in Moscow had also vindicated the decision of McCracken to pick him ahead of Luke Campbell, a gold medalist at the European championships held in Liverpool in 2008. McCracken said of the decision "It doesn't matter if you're a reigning champion or number five in the world...You've got to prove yourself because there are others knocking on your door".

=== Commonwealth championships ===
Prior to the European championships Weaver had enjoyed more success in March winning gold at the Commonwealth boxing championships in New Delhi. Speaking of his achievement his dad Jay Weaver described the result as like "winning the lottery". Weaver defeated Olympic bronze medalist Bruno Julie, India's Commonwealth gold medallist Akhil Kumar and Sri Lankan MDK Wanniarachchi in the final of the 56 kg category. Prior to the victory in the championships Weaver had also won gold in the 2008 junior championships held in Pune where he came from 4 points down to beat local fighter Vitas Krishna 16–10. Speaking again of his son's victory over Kumar in the 2010 competition Jay Weaver said "Akhil Kumar is a god in India. He’s phenomenal, so for Iain to beat him the way he did is some achievement. It stands him in good stead for the main Commonwealth Games in October." Weaver was selected in the England team to contest the main Commonwealth Games in 2010 which were again held in Delhi. He defeated Vusie Simelane of Swaziland 10-1 to set up a quarter final clash against Kumar, the home town favourite. Kumar however proved to be too wily for the Englishman and came out an 11-6 winner to avenge his defeat earlier in the year before a vocal crowd.

=== Domestic honours ===
Domestically Weaver was crowned ABA champion in 2009 with a win over Blain Younis beating him 19–14 in the final. It was the first time Weaver had fought in the senior ABA's following success in the juniors in the preceding two years. Speaking of the win Frankie Gavin, the World champion in 2007 said "Iain is the best prospect I have seen for a while. I am sure he will win a medal at the 2012 Olympics". On 13 November 2010 Weaver took part in the inaugural GB Amateur Boxing Championships held at the Echo Arena in Liverpool and televised on BBC television. In the final of the tournament Weaver met former European amateur champion
