= 2010 European Amateur Boxing Championships =

Boxing competitions

- Host city: Moscow
- Country: Russia
- Dates: 4–13 June
- Main venue: Megasport Sport Palace

The Men's 2010 European Amateur Boxing Championships were held at the Megasport Sport Palace in Moscow, Russia from June 4 to June 13, 2010. It was the 38th edition of this biennial competition organised by the European governing body for amateur boxing, EUBC.

== Medal winners ==
Event	Gold	Silver	Bronze
Light Flyweight (– 48 kilograms)	(Republic of Ireland) Paddy Barnes; Ireland	Elvin Mamishzade; Azerbaijan	Hovhannes Danielyan; Armenia José Kelvin de la Nieve Linares; Spain
Flyweight (– 51 kilograms)	Misha Aloyan; Russia	Khalid Saeed Yafai; England	Vincenzo Picardi; Italy Ronny Beblik; Germany
Bantamweight (– 54 kilograms)	Eduard Abzalimov; Russia	Georgiy Chygayev; Ukraine	Andrew Selby; Wales Gamal Yafai; England
Featherweight (– 57 kilograms)	Denis Makarov; Germany	Iain Weaver; England	Sergey Kunitsyn; Belarus (Republic of Ireland) Tyrone McCullough; Ireland
Lightweight (– 60 kilograms)	Albert Selimov; Russia	Thomas Stalker; England	Eugen Burhard; Germany (Republic of Ireland) Eric Donovan; Ireland
Light Welterweight (– 64 kilograms)	Hrachik Javakhyan; Armenia	Gyula Káté; Hungary	Alexander Solyannikov; Russia Oleksandr Klyuchko; Ukraine
Welterweight (– 69 kilograms)	Balázs Bacskai; Hungary	Alexis Vastine; France	Magomed Nurutdinov; Belarus Taras Shelestyuk; Ukraine
Middleweight (– 75 kilograms)	Artem Chebotarev; Russia	(Republic of Ireland) Darren O'Neill; Ireland	Nikolay Veselov; Belarus Mladen Manev; Bulgaria
Light Heavyweight (– 81 kilograms)	Artur Beterbiyev; Russia	Abdelkader Bouhenia; France	Artur Khachatryan; Armenia (Republic of Ireland) Kenneth Egan; Ireland
Heavyweight (– 91 kilograms)	Egor Mekhontsev; Russia	Tervel Pulev; Bulgaria	Denis Poyatsika; Ukraine Jozsef Darmos; Hungary
Super Heavyweight (+ 91 kilograms)	Sergey Kuzmin; Russia	Viktar Zuyev; Belarus	Yousef Abdelghani; Israel Roman Kapitonenko; Ukraine

== Medal table ==
Rank	Nation	Gold	Silver	Bronze	Total
1	Russia (RUS)	7	0	1	8
2	Ireland (IRL)	1	1	3	5
3	Hungary (HUN)	1	1	1	3
4	Armenia (ARM)	1	0	2	3
4	Germany (GER)	1	0	2	3
6	England (ENG)	0	3	1	4
7	France (FRA)	0	2	0	2
8	Ukraine (UKR)	0	1	4	5
9	Belarus (BLR)	0	1	3	4
10	Bulgaria (BUL)	0	1	1	2
11	Azerbaijan (AZE)	0	1	0	1
12	Israel (ISR)	0	0	1	1
12	Italy (ITA)	0	0	1	1
12	Spain (ESP)	0	0	1	1
12	Wales (WAL)	0	0	1	1
Totals (15 entries)		11	11	22	44
