= Merab Turkadze =

Georgian boxer

Personal information
- Nationality: Georgian
- Born: 14 August 1988 (age 36); Kutaisi, Soviet Georgia
- Height: 1.73 m (5 ft 8 in)

Sport
- Sport: Boxing

Merab Turkadze is a Georgian boxer. At the 2012 Summer Olympics, he competed in the Men's bantamweight, but was defeated in the first round.
