= Adam Nolan =

Irish boxer (born 1987)

Adam Nolan (born 11 March 1987) is an Irish retired boxer from Enniscorthy, County Wexford who qualified for the 2012 Olympics.

== Boxing career ==
Nolan is the second Wexford-born boxer to qualify for the Olympics, the first being his coach on the Irish team, Billy Walsh. Nolan was the fifth Irish boxer to qualify for the 2012 Olympics to compete at Welterweight. He is a club mate at Bray Boxing Club with five-time World Champion and Olympic Gold Medalist Katie Taylor. Bray was the only boxing club in the world who qualified two boxers to London 2012, and is the only boxing club in history to have a male and a female boxer feature in the Olympic games. Nolan finished in the top two at welterweight at the 2012 European Boxing Olympic Qualification Tournament which gained him qualification to the Olympics. He ultimately won the Qualification Tournament.

Nolan won his first match of the 2012 Olympics 14–8 against Ecuador's Carlos Sanchez but lost to Russia's Andrey Zamkovoy by nine points in the round of 16.

Nolan is a four-time Irish Elite Welterweight Champion, having won the titles in 2011, 2012, 2013 and 2015.

In March 2015, Nolan competed in the Gee Bee Multi Nations tournament in Finland. He won all three of his bouts to claim the gold medal for Ireland and the Boxer of the Tournament award. He is part of the Italia Thunder team in the WSB, and won his first 5-rounder versus Nicklaus Flaz.

== Hurling career ==
He won the 2016 Wexford Senior Hurling Championship with Oulart–The Ballagh.
