= Serik Sapiyev =

Kazakhstani boxer (born 1983)

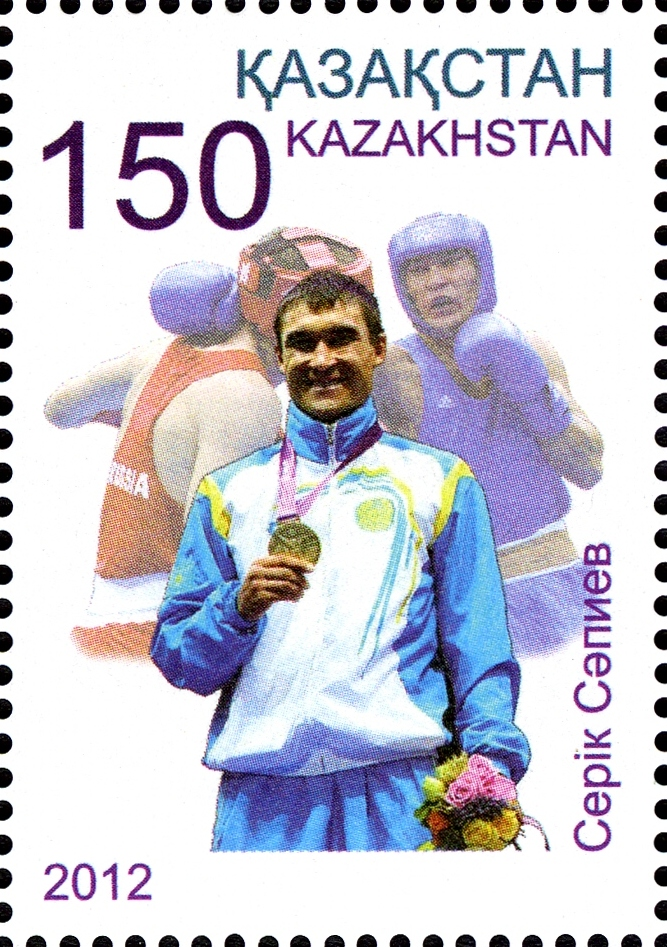
- Sapiyev on a 2012 Kazakhstan Stamp

Personal information
- Native name: Серік Жұманғалиұлы Сәпиев
- Full name: Serik Zhumangaliyevich Sapiyev
- Nationality: Kazakh
- Born: 16 November 1983 (age 42) Abay, Karagandinskaya Oblast, Kazakh SSR, Soviet Union
- Height: 1.79 m (5 ft 10 in)
- Weight: 64 kg (141 lb)

Sport
- Sport: Boxing
- Weight class: Light Welterweight
Medal record
Summer Olympics
Gold medal – first place	2012 London	Welterweight
World Championships
Gold medal – first place	2005 Mianyang	Light Welterweight
Gold medal – first place	2007 Chicago	Light Welterweight
Silver medal – second place	2011 Baku	Welterweight
Bronze medal – third place	2009 Milan	Welterweight
Asian Games
Gold medal – first place	2010 Guangzhou	Welterweight
Bronze medal – third place	2006 Doha	Light Welterweight
Asian Championships
Gold medal – first place	2007 Ulan Bator	Light Welterweight
Gold medal – first place	2009 Zhuhai	Welterweight

Serik Zhumangaliyevich Sapiyev (Kazakh: Серік Жұманғалиұлы Сәпиев, born 16 November 1983) is an amateur boxer from Kazakhstan who won the world title in the light welterweight (-64 kg) division in 2005 and 2007 and Olympic Gold 2012 at welterweight. He also won the Val Barker Trophy for best boxer at the London Olympic Games in 2012.

== Career ==
=== Light Welterweight ===
The fleetfooted southpaw counterpuncher defeated Uzbekistan's Dilshod Mahmudov at the 2005 World Amateur Boxing Championships.

He also won bronze at the 2006 Asian Games after losing to Thailand's Olympic Gold medallist Manus Boonjumnong whom he knocked down in the fight but still lost 18–22.

At the 2007 World Amateur Boxing Championships he reached the final, by beating Manus conqueror Masatsugu Kawachi of Uzbekistan, where he won against Russian fellow southpaw Gennady Kovalev 20:5.

At the 2008 Olympics (results) he once again lost to defending champion Manus Boonjumnong 5:7 and moved up in weight.

=== Welterweight ===
At the 2009 World Amateur Boxing Championships he was upset in the semis by Russian southpaw Andrey Zamkovoy and won a bronze.

At the 2011 World Amateur Boxing Championships he won silver, losing to Ukrainian Taras Shelestyuk.

Sapiyev won Olympic gold and the Val Barker Trophy for best boxer at London 2012. This time he defeated Zamkovoy in the semis and beat Welsh boxer Fred Evans in the final.

=== World Amateur championship results ===
2005

- Defeated Pavol Hlavacka (Slovakia) 37–13
- Defeated Karl Dargan (United States) 37–26
- Defeated Mykola Semenyaga (Ukraine) 27–15
- Defeated Emil Magerramov (Azerbaijan) 41–23
- Defeated Dilshod Mahmudov (Uzbekistan) 39–21

2007

- Defeated Milan Piperski (Serbia) 22–6
- Defeated Eduardo Mendoza (boxer) (Nicaragua) RSCO 2
- Defeated Kevin Bizier (Canada) RSCO 3
- Defeated Morteza Sepahvandi (Iran) AB 4
- Defeated Masatsugu Kawachi (Japan) RSCO 3
- Defeated Gennady Kovalev (Russia) 20–5
