= Jaoid Chiguer =

French boxer (1985–2021)

Jaoid Chiguer, by some sources spelled Jaouad (11 August 1985 – 25 January 2021), was a French amateur boxer who qualified for the 2008 Olympics at welterweight.

At the second qualifier, he upset the off-form European champion Andrey Balanov and Kakhaber Zhvania who both also qualified.

He defeated Aliasker Bashirov 17:6 in his first bout.

Chiguer died on 25 January 2021, at the age of 35, after suffering a cardiac arrest.
