= Ilyas Abbadi =

Algerian boxer (born 1992)

Personal information
- Nationality: Algerian
- Born: 21 October 1992 (age 33) Médéa, Algeria
- Height: 6 ft 1 in (185 cm)
- Weight: Welterweight

Boxing career
- Stance: Southpaw

Boxing record
- Total fights: 2
- Wins: 2
- Win by KO: 1
Medal record
Men's amateur boxing
Representing Algeria
African Championships
Silver medal – second place	2011 Yaoundé	Welterweight
Arab Championships
Silver medal – second place	2011 Doha	Welterweight

Ilyas Abbadi (born 21 October 1992) is an Algerian professional boxer. As an amateur, he competed in the men's welterweight event at the 2012 Summer Olympics, but was defeated in the first round by British fighter Fred Evans. At the 2016 Summer Olympics in Rio de Janeiro, he competed in the men's middleweight division. He was defeated in the second round by Zhanibek Alimkhanuly of Kazakhstan.

Abbadi also won silver medals at the 2011 African Championships and the 2011 Arab Championships.

As a professional Abbadi holds two victories over Anthony Brard (UD) and Cesar Teme (KO).
