= Pavlo Ishchenko =

Ukrainian-Israeli boxer (born 1992)

Personal information
- Native name: פבלו אישצ'נקו
- Nickname: Wild Man
- Nationality: Ukrainian-Israeli
- Born: Павел Олегович Ищенко; April 30, 1992 (age 34) Petropavlovsk-Kamchatsky, Kamchatka Krai, Russia
- Height: 1.70 m (5 ft 7 in)

Sport
- Country: Ukraine / Israel
- Sport: Boxing
- Event: Bantamweight
- Coached by: Oleg Ishchenko
Medal record
Men's amateur boxing
European Championships
Representing Ukraine
Gold medal – first place	2013 Minsk	Lightweight
Representing Israel
Bronze medal – third place	2017 Kharkiv	Lightweight

Pavlo Olehovych Ishchenko (Hebrew: פבלו אולהוביץ' אישצ'נקו; Ukrainian: Павел Олегович Ищенко; nicknamed "Wild Man"; born April 30, 1992) is an Olympic Ukrainian-Israeli boxer who competes as a bantamweight. (Note: "Pavlo Ishchenko". London 2012. The London Organising Committee of the Olympic Games and Paralympic Games Limited.) He won the gold medal at the 2013 European Amateur Boxing Championships as a Lightweight (60 kg) for Ukraine. In 2017, boxing for Israel, he won a bronze medal at the 2017 European Amateur Boxing Championships as a Lightweight.

== Early and personal life ==
Ishchenko was born in Petropavlovsk-Kamchatsky, Kamchatka Krai, Russia, and is Jewish. His father, Oleg Ishchenko, is also Jewish and is his coach. He grew up in Kherson, in southern Ukraine, where he attended the local Chabad.

== Boxing career ==
He represented Ukraine at the 2012 Summer Olympics, at 20 years of age, and was defeated in Round One of the Men's bantamweight by Joseph Diaz of the United States, 9–19, and came in 17th.

He won the gold medal at the 2013 European Amateur Boxing Championships as a Lightweight (60 kg) for Ukraine, receiving congratulations from Prime Minister Mykola Azarov. He also won a bronze medal at the Baku 2015 European Games, as he pulled out injured from his semi-final bout. He competed for Ukraine until 2015.

As an amateur he had a record of 294–23.

In February 2016, he defeated Rafael Vazquez of Puerto Rico in a unanimous six-round decision in New York City, to bring his professional record to 3–0 (2 KOs).

In 2017, he won the Israeli National Championship in the lightweight division. That same year, boxing for Israel, he won a bronze medal at the 2017 European Amateur Boxing Championships as a Lightweight.
