= Salomo Ntuve =

Swedish boxer

Salomo Ntuve (born 20 November 1988, in Kondoa, Dodoma, Tanzania) is a Swedish boxer. At the 2012 Summer Olympics, he competed in the Men's flyweight, but was defeated in the first round.
