= Fred Evans (boxer) =

Welsh boxer (born 1991)

Personal information
- Nationality: British
- Born: Freddie William Evans; 4 February 1991 (age 35) St. Mellons, Cardiff, Wales
- Height: 5 ft 11 in (180 cm)
- Weight: 69 kg (152 lb)

Boxing career
- Weight class: Welterweight
- Stance: Southpaw

Boxing record
- Total fights: 6
- Wins: 5
- Win by KO: 0
- Losses: 1
Medal record
Men's amateur boxing
Representing Great Britain
Olympic Games
Silver medal – second place	2012 London	Welterweight
Representing Wales
European Amateur Championships
Gold medal – first place	2011 Ankara	Welterweight

Freddie William Evans (born 4 February 1991) is a British professional boxer fighting in the 69 kg welterweight category. As an amateur, he won gold at the 2007 World Cadet Championships in Hungary and won gold for Wales at the 2011 European Amateur Boxing Championships in Ankara. He was the first Welsh boxer to achieve the feat in 86 years.

Evans won Olympic silver for Great Britain in the welterweight division, losing in the final to Kazakh boxer Serik Sapiyev. His achievement made him the most successful Welsh boxer in Olympic history, surpassing the record of Ralph Evans at the 1972 Summer Olympics. He turned professional in 2015.

== Early life ==
Evans was born in Cardiff, Wales to Tracey and Fred Evans. From a young age, he showed a keen interest in boxing, first attending a gym at the age of four with his father. He took up the sport himself, initially joining Cwmavon Hornets' gym, and fought his first bout at the age of ten. In March 2006, Evans' mother and younger sister Scarlett were killed in an automobile accident on the A48 near Cardiff. Evans is a member of the travelling community and is the cousin of fellow boxer Gary Buckland.

== Amateur career ==
Evans joined St Joseph's Amateur Boxing Club in Newport as a teenager. He developed a reputation as a talented fighter and won a gold medal at the Four Nations Championships, a tournament between fighters from the Home Nations, at the age of 15 weeks after the death of his mother. Evans went on to win gold at the 2007 World Cadet Championships in Hungary. He also entered the 2008 AIBA Youth World Boxing Championships in Guadalajara but was defeated by eventual winner, Irish fighter Ray Moylette. In the same year, Evans was picked to travel with the British side to the 2008 Summer Olympics in Beijing at the age of 17 in order to experience the atmosphere at the games before being selected for the GB development squad.

Evans was also one of eight fighters from St Josephs who were chosen to represent Wales in the Senior Novice Welsh Championships against a team from the United States in 2009. The following year, he was selected in a British side for an event against boxers representing the Rest of the World organised by the World Boxing Council (WBC). Evans met American fighter Errol Spence Jr. where, despite a strong start to the fight, he eventually suffered a 15–9 points defeat. The same year Evans competed in the 2010 Commonwealth Games in Delhi but suffered a first round points defeat to Mauritanian fighter Kennedy St-Pierre.

In 2011, Evans competed in the European Amateur Boxing Championships in Ankara. He defeated Belarusian Magomed Nurutdinov 15–9 on points to win a gold medal. His victory, along with that of flyweight Andrew Selby, was the first time a Welsh fighter had won gold at the event for 86 years and only the third time a British fighter had won since 1961. Later the same year, Evans reached the quarter-finals of the 2011 AIBA World Boxing Championships in Baku, being stopped by Lithuanian Egidijus Kavaliauskas.

=== 2012 Olympics ===
Following his performances at the European and World Championships, Evans was confirmed as the youngest member of Britain's boxing squad for the 2012 Summer Olympics in London in late 2011 at the age of 21, entering the tournament as the number two ranked amateur welterweight in the world. Evans was one of two Welsh fighters included in the squad, along with Andrew Selby, the first time any Welsh fighter had made the GB Olympic boxing squad since 1984. His selection fulfilled a childhood dream of competing at an Olympic Games having idolised Amir Khan following his breakthrough at the 2004 Summer Olympics. In preparation for the games, Evans relocated to the Team GB gym run by Robert McCracken and also sparred with Carl Froch ahead of his IBF super-middleweight title fight with Lucian Bute.

Evans made his Olympic debut on 29 July 2012 against Algerian Ilyas Abbadi in front of a partisan home crowd at the ExCeL London. His quarter-final exit in the previous years world championships resulted in Evans losing out on a first round bye. Boxing pundit Steve Bunce commented the Evans "picked his punches with ease" as he won the fight by a comfortable 18–10 points decision. His victory set-up a rematch with Egidijus Kavaliauskas who had defeated Evans at the world championships the previous year. Kavaliauskas proved a much sterner test in the second round, as the Lithuanian took the first round of the bout. Evans fought back to tie the fight at 5–5 at the end of the second round before producing a "masterclass" in the third to secure an 11–7 victory and advance to the quarter-finals.

Evans met Canadian Custio Clayton in the quarter-final, ending the first round with a five-point advantage over his opponent. However, Clayton fought back, trailing by two points after the second round before tying the fight at 14 each at the end of the fight. As a result, the fight was decided by countback, handing Evans victory. The Canadian team unsuccessfully appealed the decision, claiming Evans should have been deducted points for receiving persistent warnings from the referee. Victory guaranteed Evans at least a bronze medal and Evans was one of the five boxers that had equalled Britain's best ever boxing medal tally at an Olympic Games since 1956. In the semi-final, Evans met the world number one ranked fighter, Ukrainian Taras Shelestyuk. The first round of the fight was subdued as both fighters settled and but Evans took a 4–1 lead. He maintained his lead through the second round which finished 8–5 as Shelestyuk pushed forward. Although Shelestyuk won the third round, Evans held on to claim an 11–10 victory.

In the final, Evans met Serik Sapiyev of Kazakhstan on 12 August. However, Evans struggled to establish himself in the fight and Sapiyev won a comfortable 17–9 victory. Despite his defeat, Evans' silver medal made him the most successful Welsh Olympic boxer ever, surpassing the bronze medal won by Ralph Evans at the 1972 Summer Olympics.

=== Post Olympics ===
Evans returned to the ring in November 2012 to compete for the British Lionhearts team in the World Series of Boxing event. He defeated Michel Tavares of the Italia Thunder in his debut in the competition via split decision.

Evans was named in the British squad to compete at the 2013 AIBA World Boxing Championships in Kazakhstan. He entered the tournament as the number one ranked welterweight but suffered a defeat to German Arajik Marutjan in the early rounds of the competition. He was selected in the Welsh team for the 2014 Commonwealth Games and was regarded as one of his nation's biggest hopes of a medal. However, he was denied accreditation to compete at the tournament due to a conviction for assault earlier in the year.

== Professional career ==
In December 2015, Evans announced he would be turning professional and signed with manager Chris Sanigar. He made his professional debut in May 2017, defeating Najim Fennane on points in Cardiff. Evans won four further fights in the following year to advance his record to 5–0. In October 2018, Evans suffered a surprise defeat to Ryan Toms in his sixth professional fight. Toms knocked Evans down for the first time in his career during the second round and won the fight with a second knockdown in the same round.

== Personal life ==
In April 2014, Evans plead guilty to Common assault following a fight at a lap-dancing club in Birmingham two months earlier. He was fined £435 as well as being ordered to pay £500 compensation to the victim. In October 2014, Evans was given a suspended jail term after punching a man in a pub in Gloucestershire – despite a judge saying he "deserved" prison. Evans admitted unlawfully wounding the victim, breaking his jaw.
