= Rain Karlson =

Estonian boxer

Rain Karlson (born 19 February 1992) is an Estonian boxer.

He was born in Tallinn. In 2016 he graduated from Tallinn University's in physical education.

He began his boxing career in 2006, coached by Aleksandr Jegorov and Ervin Kade. In 2012 he won gold medal at World University Championships. He is multiple-times Estonian champion. 2011–2018 he was a member of Estonian national boxing team.

In 2012, 2013 and 2014 he was named as Best Boxer of Estonia.
