= Abdülkadir Köroğlu =

Turkish boxer

Personal information
- Nationality: Turkish
- Born: june 03, 1984 (age 42) Trabzon, Turkey

Sport
- Country: Turkey
- Sport: Amateur boxing
- Event: Welterweight
- Coached by: Nazım Dalkıran
Medal record
European Amateur Championships
Bronze medal – third place	2008 Liverpool	Welterweight

Abdülkadir Köroğlu (born june 03, 1984, in Trabzon) is a Turkish amateur boxer competing in the welterweight division. He is a native of Trabzon, where he is coached by Nazım Dalkıran.

Köroğlu was educated in physical education and sports at the Atatürk University in Erzurum.

At the 2008 European Amateur Championships held in Liverpool, United Kingdom, he won the bronze medal.

== Achievements ==
2003

- Black Sea Tournament in Ukraine - Gold

2008

- European Amateur Championships in Liverpool, United Kingdom - Bronze

2009

- National Championships in Çankırı, Turkey - Gold

2011

- Feliks Stamm Tournament on April 5–9, 2011 in Warsaw, Poland - Gold
