= Andrey Zamkovoy =

Russian boxer (born 1987)

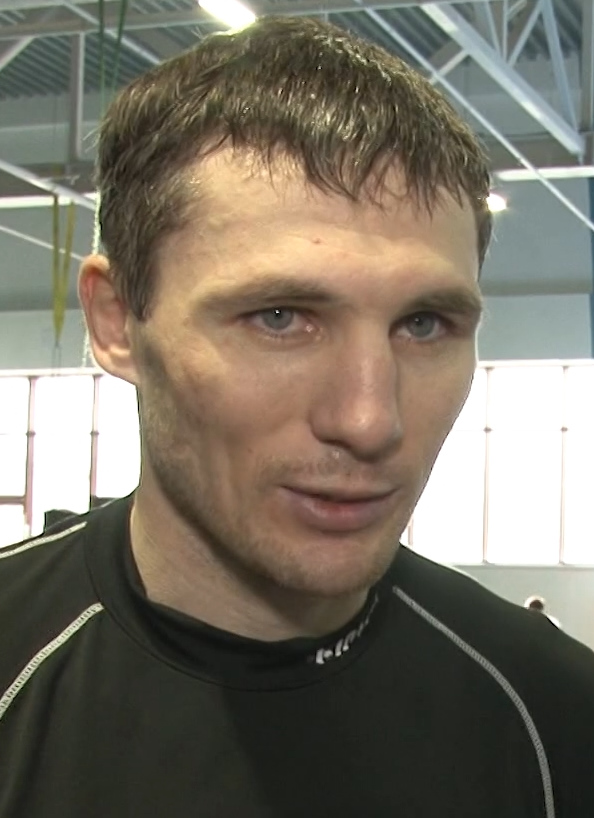
- Zamkovoy in January 2019

Personal information
- Nationality: Russian
- Born: 4 July 1987 (age 39) Svobodny, Amur Oblast, Russian SFSR
- Height: 1.86 m (6 ft 1 in)
- Weight: 69 kg (152 lb)

Boxing career
- Weight class: Welterweight
- Stance: Southpaw

Boxing record
- Total fights: 137
- Wins: 118
- Win by KO: 4
- Losses: 19
- Draws: 0
- No contests: 0
Medal record
Men's boxing
Representing ROC
Olympic Games
Bronze medal – third place	2020 Tokyo	Welterweight
Representing Russia
Olympic Games
Bronze medal – third place	2012 London	Welterweight
World Championships
Gold medal – first place	2019 Yekaterinburg	Welterweight
Silver medal – second place	2009 Milan	Welterweight
Summer Universiade
Gold medal – first place	2013 Kazan	Welterweight

Andrey Viktorovoich Zamkovoy (Russian: Андрей Викторович Замковой, IPA: [ɐnˈdrʲej zəmkɐˈvoj]; born 4 July 1987) is a Russian amateur boxer, best known for winning gold at the 2019 AIBA World Boxing Championships.

== Biography ==
Andrey Zamkovoy was born in the city of Svobodny, Amur Oblast. He started boxing at the age of eight.

== Career ==
From 2000 to 2015 Andrey's coach was Felix Gelyus.

At the 2009 World Amateur Boxing Championships, southpaw Zamkovoy upset two-time world champion Serik Sapiyev in the semifinal but was surprised himself in the final by German Jack Culcay-Keth (2009 results).

At the 2012 Summer Olympics (Results) he won his first three fights, beating China's Maimaitituersun Qiong, Ireland's Adam Nolan and America's Errol Spence Jr. before losing his semifinal to Kazakhstan's Serik Säpïev, who went on to win the gold medal.

He also competed at the 2016 Olympic Games, but lost in the first round of the tournament against Rayton Okwiri of Kenya.

Zamkovoy again qualified for the 2020 Olympics where he won his second bronze, now as a 34 year old.

Andrey Zamkovoy is an eight-time Russian boxing champion. He won in 2010, 2011, 2013, 2015, 2017, 2018, 2020 and in 2023.
