= Maddie Martin =

British wheelchair basketball player (born 2004)

- Martin at the 2026 Wheelchair Basketball World Championships

Personal information
- Full name: Maddison Martin
- Born: 24 July 2004 (age 22)

Sport
- Sport: Wheelchair basketball
- Disability: Spina bifida
- Disability class: 3.0
Medal record
Women's wheelchair basketball
Representing Great Britain
European Championships
Silver medal – second place	2023 Rotterdam	Team
Silver medal – second place	2025 Sarajevo	Team

Maddison Martin (born 24 July 2004) is a British wheelchair basketball player and a member of Great Britain women's national wheelchair basketball team. She represented Great Britain at the 2024 Summer Paralympics.

== Early life ==
Martin was born with spina bifida. She attended Castle View Academy. She made the decision to take up wheelchair basketball in 2015 after being inspired by the 2012 Summer Paralympics.

== Career ==
Martin made her international debut for Great Britain at the 2022 Wheelchair Basketball World Championships.

She represented Great Britain at the 2023 IWBF Women's European Championship and won a silver medal. With the win, Great Britain qualified for the 2024 Summer Paralympics. She represented Great Britain at the 2024 Summer Paralympics in wheelchair basketball.

On 11 August 2025, she was selected to represent Great Britain at the 2025 European Wheelchair Basketball Championship. She helped Great Britain win a silver medal.

In July 2026, she was selected to represent Great Britain at the 2026 Wheelchair Basketball World Championships.
