= Vasile Belous =

Moldovan boxer (1988–2021)

Personal information
- Born: 27 August 1988 Ocnița, Moldavian SSR, Soviet Union
- Died: 31 August 2021 (aged 33) Călărășeuca, Moldova

Sport
- Sport: Amateur boxing
Medal record
Men's amateur boxing
Representing Moldova
European Championships
Bronze medal – third place	2017 Kharkiv	Welterweight

Vasile Belous (27 August 1988 – 31 August 2021) was a Moldovan boxer. At the 2012 Summer Olympics, he competed in the Men's welterweight, but was defeated in the second round.
