= Magomed Nurutdinov =

Belarusian boxer (born 1982)

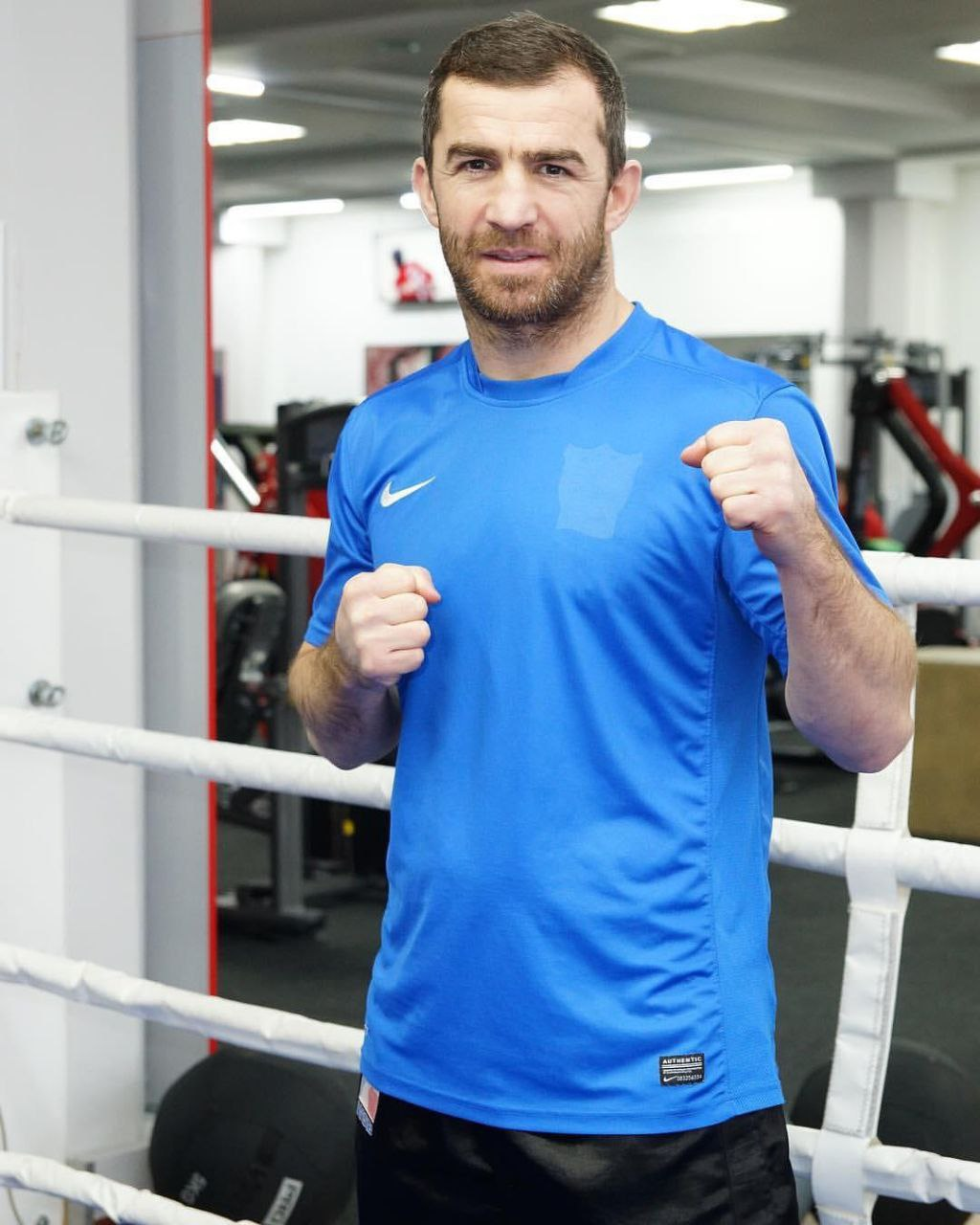

Medal record

Representing Belarus

Men's Boxing

World Amateur Championships
Silver medal – second place	Mianyang 2005	Welterweight

European Amateur Championships
Gold medal – first place	2008 Liverpool	Welterweight
Silver medal – second place	2011 Ankara	Welterweight
Bronze medal – third place	2010 Moscow	Welterweight

Magomed Nurutdinov/Mahamed Nurudzinau (born February 5, 1982) is a Belarusian amateur boxer who boxed at the Olympics 2008 at welterweight and later became European champion.

At the 2005 World Championships he beat Konstantin Buga, Adam Trupish and Neil Perkins but lost the final to Cuban Erislandi Lara.

At the 2006 European Championships he was edged out by little-known Zoran Mitrovic, at the 2007 World Championships he won two bouts then was outclassed 6:26 by local hero and eventual winner Demetrius Andrade.

At the Olympics he was upset by John Jackson 2:4.

He won the bronze medal at the 2010 European Amateur Boxing Championships at Moscow, Russia after losing in the Semifinals against Alexis Vastine from France.
