= Boxing at the 2010 Asian Games =

- Venue: Lingnan Mingzhu Gymnasium
- Dates: 16–26 November 2010
- Competitors: 210 from 35 nations

Boxing at the 2010 Asian Games was held in Lingnan Mingzhu Gymnasium, Foshan, China from November 16 to 26, 2010.

== Schedule ==
P	Round of 32	R	Round of 16	¼	Quarterfinals	½	Semifinals	F	Final

Event↓/Date →	16th Tue	17th Wed	18th Thu	19th Fri	20th Sat	21st Sun	22nd Mon	23rd Tue	24th Wed	25th Thu	26th Fri
Men's 49 kg			P		R		¼		½		F
Men's 52 kg	P		R		¼				½	F	
Men's 56 kg	P		R			¼			½		F
Men's 60 kg		P		R		¼			½	F	
Men's 64 kg	P			R			¼		½		F
Men's 69 kg		P			R		¼		½	F	
Men's 75 kg	P	R			¼				½		F
Men's 81 kg		R		¼					½	F	
Men's 91 kg				R		¼			½		F
Men's +91 kg	R		¼						½	F	
Women's 51 kg						R	¼		½	F	
Women's 60 kg						R	¼		½		F
Women's 75 kg							¼		½		F

== Medalists ==
=== Men ===
Event	Gold	Silver	Bronze
Light flyweight (49 kg)	Zou Shiming; China	Birzhan Zhakypov; Kazakhstan	Amnat Ruenroeng; Thailand
Light flyweight (49 kg)	Zou Shiming; China	Birzhan Zhakypov; Kazakhstan	Vic Saludar; Philippines
Flyweight (52 kg)	Rey Saludar; Philippines	Chang Yong; China	Katsuaki Susa; Japan
Flyweight (52 kg)	Rey Saludar; Philippines	Chang Yong; China	Suranjoy Singh; India
Bantamweight (56 kg)	Worapoj Petchkoom; Thailand	Zhang Jiawei; China	Ri Myong-son; North Korea
Bantamweight (56 kg)	Worapoj Petchkoom; Thailand	Zhang Jiawei; China	Wessam Salamana; Syria
Lightweight (60 kg)	Vikas Krishan Yadav; India	Hu Qing; China	Han Soon-chul; South Korea
Lightweight (60 kg)	Vikas Krishan Yadav; India	Hu Qing; China	Hurshid Tojibaev; Uzbekistan
Light welterweight (64 kg)	Daniyar Yeleussinov; Kazakhstan	V. Santhosh Kumar; India	Wuttichai Masuk; Thailand
Light welterweight (64 kg)	Daniyar Yeleussinov; Kazakhstan	V. Santhosh Kumar; India	Sanjarbek Rahmonov; Uzbekistan
Welterweight (69 kg)	Serik Sapiyev; Kazakhstan	Uktamjon Rahmonov; Uzbekistan	Maimaitituersun Qiong; China
Welterweight (69 kg)	Serik Sapiyev; Kazakhstan	Uktamjon Rahmonov; Uzbekistan	Jargalyn Otgonjargal; Mongolia
Middleweight (75 kg)	Vijender Singh; India	Abbos Atoev; Uzbekistan	Danabek Suzhanov; Kazakhstan
Middleweight (75 kg)	Vijender Singh; India	Abbos Atoev; Uzbekistan	Mohammad Sattarpour; Iran
Light heavyweight (81 kg)	Elshod Rasulov; Uzbekistan	Dinesh Kumar; India	Deepak Maharjan; Nepal
Light heavyweight (81 kg)	Elshod Rasulov; Uzbekistan	Dinesh Kumar; India	Meng Fanlong; China
Heavyweight (91 kg)	Mohammad Ghossoun; Syria	Manpreet Singh; India	Jahon Qurbonov; Tajikistan
Heavyweight (91 kg)	Mohammad Ghossoun; Syria	Manpreet Singh; India	Ali Mazaheri; Iran
Super heavyweight (+91 kg)	Zhang Zhilei; China	Ivan Dychko; Kazakhstan	Rouhollah Hosseini; Iran
Super heavyweight (+91 kg)	Zhang Zhilei; China	Ivan Dychko; Kazakhstan	Paramjeet Samota; India

=== Women ===
Event	Gold	Silver	Bronze
Flyweight (51 kg)	Ren Cancan; China	Annie Albania; Philippines	Mary Kom; India
Flyweight (51 kg)	Ren Cancan; China	Annie Albania; Philippines	Aya Shinmoto; Japan
Lightweight (60 kg)	Dong Cheng; China	Tassamalee Thongjan; Thailand	Yun Kum-ju; North Korea
Lightweight (60 kg)	Dong Cheng; China	Tassamalee Thongjan; Thailand	Saida Khassenova; Kazakhstan
Middleweight (75 kg)	Li Jinzi; China	Erdenesoyolyn Undram; Mongolia	Seong Su-yeon; South Korea
Middleweight (75 kg)	Li Jinzi; China	Erdenesoyolyn Undram; Mongolia	Kavita Goyat; India

== Medal table ==
Rank	Nation	Gold	Silver	Bronze	Total
1	China (CHN)	5	3	2	10
2	India (IND)	2	3	4	9
3	Kazakhstan (KAZ)	2	2	2	6
4	Uzbekistan (UZB)	1	2	2	5
5	Thailand (THA)	1	1	2	4
6	Philippines (PHI)	1	1	1	3
7	Syria (SYR)	1	0	1	2
8	Mongolia (MGL)	0	1	1	2
9	Iran (IRI)	0	0	3	3
10	Japan (JPN)	0	0	2	2
10	North Korea (PRK)	0	0	2	2
10	South Korea (KOR)	0	0	2	2
13	Nepal (NEP)	0	0	1	1
13	Tajikistan (TJK)	0	0	1	1
Totals (14 entries)		13	13	26	52

== Participating nations ==
A total of 210 athletes from 35 nations competed in boxing at the 2010 Asian Games:

- Afghanistan (3)
- Athletes from Kuwait (2)
- Bangladesh (3)
- Bhutan (3)
- Cambodia (2)
- China (13)
- Chinese Taipei (5)
- India (13)
- Indonesia (2)
- Iran (9)
- Iraq (2)
- Japan (5)
- Jordan (3)
- Kazakhstan (13)
- Kyrgyzstan (11)
- Laos (4)
- Macau (4)
- Malaysia (4)
- Mongolia (12)
- Nepal (6)
- North Korea (6)
- Pakistan (7)
- Palestine (2)
- Philippines (6)
- Qatar (4)
- Saudi Arabia (4)
- South Korea (13)
- Sri Lanka (4)
- Syria (4)
- Tajikistan (3)
- Thailand (11)
- Timor-Leste (4)
- Turkmenistan (9)
- Uzbekistan (10)
- Vietnam (4)
