= 2012 Asian Boxing Olympic Qualification Tournament =

Boxing competitions

The 2012 Asian Boxing Olympic Qualification Tournament was held in Astana, Kazakhstan from April 5 to April 12.

== Qualified athletes ==
Weight	1st	2nd	3rd	4th
Light flyweight (49kg)	Birzhan Zhakypov (KAZ)			
Flyweight (52kg)	Ilyas Suleimenov (KAZ)	Nyambayaryn Tögstsogt (MGL)	Pak Jong-chol (PRK)	Katsuaki Susa (JPN)
Bantamweight (56kg)	Shiva Thapa (IND)	Wessam Salamana (SYR)	Satoshi Shimizu (JPN)	
Lightweight (60kg)	Liu Qiang (CHN)			
Light welterweight (64kg)	Daniyar Yeleussinov (KAZ)	Serdar Hudaýberdiýew (TKM)	Uktamjon Rahmonov (UZB)	Mehdi Tolouti (IRI)
Welterweight (69kg)	Maimaitituersun Qiong (CHN)	Byambyn Tüvshinbat (MGL)	Amin Ghasemipour (IRI)	
Middleweight (75kg)	Abbos Atoev (UZB)	Nursähet Pazzyýew (TKM)	Sobirjon Nazarov (TJK)	Vijender Singh (IND)
Light heavyweight (81kg)	Sumit Sangwan (IND)	Jahon Qurbonov (TJK)	Ihab Al-Matbouli (JOR)	
Heavyweight (91kg)	Ali Mazaheri (IRI)			
Super heavyweight (+91kg)	Zhang Zhilei (CHN)			

== Qualification summary ==
NOC	49	52	56	60	64	69	75	81	91	+91	Total
China				X		X				X	3
India			X				X	X			3
Iran					X	X			X		3
Japan		X	X								2
Jordan								X			1
Kazakhstan	X	X			X						3
Mongolia		X				X					2
North Korea		X									1
Syria			X								1
Tajikistan							X	X			2
Turkmenistan					X		X				2
Uzbekistan					X		X				2
Total: 12 NOCs	1	4	3	1	4	3	4	3	1	1	25

== Results ==
=== Light flyweight ===
Quarterfinals; April 9
Muhammad Nisar (PAK)	5
Birzhan Zhakypov (KAZ)	25
Asror Vohidov (TJK)	13
Hasan Ali (IRQ)	11
Naoya Inoue (JPN)	RSC
Asylbek Nazaraliev (KGZ)

Semifinals; April 11
Shakhobidin Zoirov (UZB)	11
Birzhan Zhakypov (KAZ)	20
Asror Vohidov (TJK)	16
Naoya Inoue (JPN)	21

Final; April 12
Birzhan Zhakypov (KAZ)	16
Naoya Inoue (JPN)	11

=== Flyweight ===
Round of 32 – April 5
	Score	
Zarip Jumaýew (TKM)	18–16	Iman Tayyebi (IRI)
Suranjoy Singh (IND)	16–14	Shin Dong-myung (KOR)
Nyambayaryn Tögstsogt (MGL)	RSC	Rey Saludar (PHI)

Round of 16; April 7
Ajmal Faisal (AFG)	8
Pak Jong-chol (PRK)	20
Julio Bria (INA)	21
Murtadha Raad (IRQ)	9
Chang Yong (CHN)	17
Safoviddin Yusufi (TJK)	13
Azat Usenaliev (KGZ)	16
Ilyas Suleimenov (KAZ)	19
Katsuaki Susa (JPN)	22
Suresh Pattiarachchi (SRI)	10
Adel Al-Matbouli (JOR)	25
Lin Yu-che (TPE)	21
Muhammad Waseem (PAK)	15
Zarip Jumaýew (TKM)	9
Suranjoy Singh (IND)	10
Nyambayaryn Tögstsogt (MGL)	30

Quarterfinals; April 9
Pak Jong-chol (PRK)	19
Julio Bria (INA)	11
Chang Yong (CHN)	12
Ilyas Suleimenov (KAZ)	19
Katsuaki Susa (JPN)	21
Adel Al-Matbouli (JOR)	10
Muhammad Waseem (PAK)	9
Nyambayaryn Tögstsogt (MGL)	22

Semifinals; April 11
Pak Jong-chol (PRK)	8
Ilyas Suleimenov (KAZ)	15
Katsuaki Susa (JPN)	6
Nyambayaryn Tögstsogt (MGL)	14

Final; April 12
Ilyas Suleimenov (KAZ)	18
Nyambayaryn Tögstsogt (MGL)	14

=== Bantamweight ===
Round of 32 – April 5
	Score	
Nguyễn Thị Huệ (VIE)	5–15	Ammar Jabbar (IRQ)
Omurbek Malabekov (KGZ)	22–9	Damith Wijeratne (SRI)
Dorjnyambuugiin Otgondalai (MGL)	12–13	Zhang Jiawei (CHN)
Seif Qraish (JOR)	7–17	Joegin Ladon (PHI)

Round of 16; April 7
Kim Myong-il (PRK)	17
Kyaw Kyaw Latt (MYA)	7
Satoshi Shimizu (JPN)	26
Kao Chih-yuan (TPE)	14
Shiva Thapa (IND)	15
Khaiber Nooristani (AFG)	7
Worapoj Petchkoom (THA)	15
Naimat Ullah (PAK)	6
Lee Do-jae (KOR)	11
Armin Amjadian (IRI)	17
Wessam Salamana (SYR)	19
Ýakub Meredow (TKM)	7
Ammar Jabbar (IRQ)	15
Omurbek Malabekov (KGZ)	14
Zhang Jiawei (CHN)	13
Joegin Ladon (PHI)	8

Quarterfinals; April 9
Kim Myong-il (PRK)	10
Satoshi Shimizu (JPN)	23
Shiva Thapa (IND)	16
Worapoj Petchkoom (THA)	10
Armin Amjadian (IRI)	13
Wessam Salamana (SYR)	17
Ammar Jabbar (IRQ)	14
Zhang Jiawei (CHN)	9

Semifinals; April 11
Satoshi Shimizu (JPN)	17
Shiva Thapa (IND)	31
Wessam Salamana (SYR)	12
Ammar Jabbar (IRQ)	8

Final; April 12
Shiva Thapa (IND)	18
Wessam Salamana (SYR)	11

=== Lightweight ===
Round of 16; April 5
Charly Suarez (PHI)	14
Madadi Nagzibekov (TJK)	11

Quarterfinals; April 9
Foroutan Golara (IRI)	11
Suraka Sabih (IRQ)	17
Zorigtbaataryn Enkhzorig (MGL)	12
Liu Qiang (CHN)	15
Daisuke Narimatsu (JPN)	17
Myrat Pazzyýew (TKM)	13
Abdilay Anarbay Uulu (KGZ)	5
Charly Suarez (PHI)	14

Semifinals; April 11
Suraka Sabih (IRQ)	6
Liu Qiang (CHN)	18
Daisuke Narimatsu (JPN)	11
Charly Suarez (PHI)	24

Final; April 12
Liu Qiang (CHN)	15
Charly Suarez (PHI)	11

=== Light welterweight ===
Round of 32 – April 5
	Score	
Wuttichai Masuk (THA)	17–9	Chang Wei-jen (TPE)
Arif Hossain (BAN)	1–17	Ermek Sakenov (KGZ)

Round of 16; April 6
Bashir Sadiq (AFG)	2
Masatsugu Kawachi (JPN)	23
Uktamjon Rahmonov (UZB)	17
Hu Qing (CHN)	14
Ibrahim Saleh (JOR)	4
Daniyar Yeleussinov (KAZ)	27
Dennis Galvan (PHI)	8
Kim Chol-song (PRK)	18
Shim Hyun-young (KOR)	13
Naziri Piraki (TJK)	8
Mehdi Tolouti (IRI)	28
Wissam Saadi (IRQ)	17
Haider Riaz (PAK)	6
Serdar Hudaýberdiýew (TKM)	21
Wuttichai Masuk (THA)	12
Ermek Sakenov (KGZ)	14

Quarterfinals; April 8
Masatsugu Kawachi (JPN)
Uktamjon Rahmonov (UZB)	RSC
Daniyar Yeleussinov (KAZ)	17
Kim Chol-song (PRK)	6
Shim Hyun-young (KOR)	16
Mehdi Tolouti (IRI)	22
Serdar Hudaýberdiýew (TKM)	12
Ermek Sakenov (KGZ)	9

Semifinals; April 11
Uktamjon Rahmonov (UZB)	7
Daniyar Yeleussinov (KAZ)	16
Mehdi Tolouti (IRI)	9
Serdar Hudaýberdiýew (TKM)	16

Final; April 12
Daniyar Yeleussinov (KAZ)	WO
Serdar Hudaýberdiýew (TKM)

=== Welterweight ===
Round of 16; April 5
Kim Jung-won (KOR)	14
Apichet Saensit (THA)	11
Ahmad Mamadjanov (UZB)	17
Bahtiýar Maşaripow (TKM)	6
Amin Ghasemipour (IRI)	19
Ahmed Abdul-Karim (IRQ)	12
Mohammad Al-Assi (JOR)	14
Khir Akyazlan Azmi (MAS)	9
Wilfredo Lopez (PHI)	10
Maimaitituersun Qiong (CHN)	20
Navruz Jafoev (TJK)	13
Asadullo Boimurodov (KGZ)	+13

Quarterfinals; April 8
Byambyn Tüvshinbat (MGL)	RSC
Zulqarnain Abbas (PAK)
Kim Jung-won (KOR)	15
Ahmad Mamadjanov (UZB)	12
Amin Ghasemipour (IRI)	24
Mohammad Al-Assi (JOR)	23
Maimaitituersun Qiong (CHN)	22
Asadullo Boimurodov (KGZ)	8

Semifinals; April 11
Byambyn Tüvshinbat (MGL)	29
Kim Jung-won (KOR)	17
Amin Ghasemipour (IRI)
Maimaitituersun Qiong (CHN)	RSC

Final; April 12
Byambyn Tüvshinbat (MGL)
Maimaitituersun Qiong (CHN)	RSCI

=== Middleweight ===
Round of 16; April 6
Yang Yu-ting (TPE)	19
Odai Al-Hindawi (JOR)	12
Sobirjon Nazarov (TJK)	16
Kriengkrai Sukkhum (THA)	11
Mohd Farkhan Haron (MAS)	15
Alex Tatontos (INA)	6
Abbos Atoev (UZB)	21
Woo Sung-jae (KOR)	6
Islomzhon Dalibaev (KGZ)	15
Tömörkhuyagiin Chuluuntömör (MGL)	16
Vijender Singh (IND)	11
Ishak Waez (SYR)	5
Waheed Abdul-Ridha (IRQ)	23
Zhang Jianting (CHN)	13
Nursähet Pazzyýew (TKM)	18
Mohammad Sattarpour (IRI)	7

Quarterfinals; April 8
Yang Yu-ting (TPE)	11
Sobirjon Nazarov (TJK)	16
Mohd Farkhan Haron (MAS)
Abbos Atoev (UZB)	RSC
Tömörkhuyagiin Chuluuntömör (MGL)	17
Vijender Singh (IND)	27
Waheed Abdul-Ridha (IRQ)	8
Nursähet Pazzyýew (TKM)	15

Semifinals; April 11
Sobirjon Nazarov (TJK)	2
Abbos Atoev (UZB)	13
Vijender Singh (IND)	7
Nursähet Pazzyýew (TKM)	10

Final; April 12
Abbos Atoev (UZB)	4
Nursähet Pazzyýew (TKM)	3

=== Light heavyweight ===
Round of 16; April 5
Sumit Sangwan (IND)	14
Lương Văn Toàn (VIE)	2
Manaf Asaad (SYR)	13
Kim Hyeong-kyu (KOR)	16
Davar Abdul-Razzaq (IRQ)	9
Rasul Ýuldaşew (TKM)	29
Deepak Maharjan (NEP)
Ihab Al-Matbouli (JOR)	RSC

Quarterfinals; April 8
Sergei Skliarov (KGZ)	18
Haidar Mansour (LIB)	9
Sandagsürengiin Erdenebayar (MGL)	16
Jahon Qurbonov (TJK)	19
Sumit Sangwan (IND)	22
Kim Hyeong-kyu (KOR)	12
Rasul Ýuldaşew (TKM)	17
Ihab Al-Matbouli (JOR)	24

Semifinals; April 11
Sergei Skliarov (KGZ)	7
Jahon Qurbonov (TJK)	12
Sumit Sangwan (IND)	24
Ihab Al-Matbouli (JOR)	12

Final; April 12
Jahon Qurbonov (TJK)	9
Sumit Sangwan (IND)	14

=== Heavyweight ===
Round of 16; April 6
Tolyekiin Yerbolat (MGL)
Manpreet Singh (IND)	RSC
Rustam Tulaganov (UZB)	11
Chingis Borbashev (KGZ)	13

Quarterfinals; April 8
Vassiliy Levit (KAZ)	18
Dilovarsho Abdurakhmonov (TJK)	2
Ahmad Teimat (JOR)	10
Mohammad Ghossoun (SYR)	18
Mohammad Fakhreddine (LIB)
Ali Mazaheri (IRI)	RSC
Manpreet Singh (IND)	RSC
Chingis Borbashev (KGZ)

Semifinals; April 11
Vassiliy Levit (KAZ)	9
Mohammad Ghossoun (SYR)	15
Ali Mazaheri (IRI)	13
Manpreet Singh (IND)	6

Final; April 12
Mohammad Ghossoun (SYR)	11
Ali Mazaheri (IRI)	14

=== Super heavyweight ===
Quarterfinals; April 9
Mirojiddin Karimov (TJK)
Zhang Zhilei (CHN)	RSCI
Izzatulla Ergashev (UZB)	15
Abdolmajid Sepahvandi (IRI)	13

Semifinals; April 11
Soumar Ghossoun (SYR)	23
Paramjeet Samota (IND)	12
Zhang Zhilei (CHN)	RET
Izzatulla Ergashev (UZB)

Final; April 12
Soumar Ghossoun (SYR)	6
Zhang Zhilei (CHN)	10

== See also ==
- Boxing at the 2012 Summer Olympics – Qualification
