= Boxing at the 2010 Asian Games – Men's 91 kg =

Boxing competitions

Men's 91 kg at the 2010 Asian Games
- Venue: Lingnan Mingzhu Gymnasium
- Date: 19–26 November 2010
- Competitors: 10 from 10 nations

Medalists
gold medal	Mohammad Ghossoun	Syria
silver medal	Manpreet Singh	India
bronze medal	Jahon Qurbonov	Tajikistan
bronze medal	Ali Mazaheri	Iran

The men's heavyweight (91 kilograms) event at the 2010 Asian Games took place from 19 to 26 November 2010 at Lingnan Mingzhu Gymnasium, Foshan, China.

All bouts consisted of three three-minute rounds. The boxers receive points for every successful punch they land on their opponent's head or upper body. The boxer with the most points at the end of the bouts wins. Like all Asian Games boxing events, the competition was a straight single-elimination tournament.

A total of 10 men from 10 countries competed in this event, limited to fighters whose body weight was less than 91 kilograms. Mohammad Ghossoun of Syria won the gold medal. He beat Manpreet Singh of India 8–1 in the final bout in Foshan Gymnasium. Jahon Qurbonov and Ali Mazaheri shared the bronze medal.

== Schedule ==
All times are China Standard Time (UTC+08:00)

Date	Time	Event
Friday, 19 November 2010	19:00	Round of 16
Sunday, 21 November 2010	19:00	Quarterfinals
Wednesday, 24 November 2010	19:00	Semifinals
Friday, 26 November 2010	19:00	Final

== Results ==
Legend

- RSC — Won by referee stop contest

Round of 16
Jeon Chan-yeong (KOR)	13
Myktybek Mamasaliev (KGZ)	2
Mohammad Ghossoun (SYR)	11
Vassiliy Levit (KAZ)	6

Quarterfinals
Zaifula Maimaiti (CHN)	4
Manpreet Singh (IND)	6
Hydyr Orazmamedow (TKM)
Jahon Qurbonov (TJK)	RSC
Mirzohid Abdullaev (UZB)	5
Ali Mazaheri (IRI)	6
Jeon Chan-yeong (KOR)	1
Mohammad Ghossoun (SYR)	10

Semifinals
Manpreet Singh (IND)	10
Jahon Qurbonov (TJK)	2
Ali Mazaheri (IRI)	1
Mohammad Ghossoun (SYR)	2

Final
Manpreet Singh (IND)	1
Mohammad Ghossoun (SYR)	8
