= Boxing at the 2010 Asian Games – Men's 56 kg =

Boxing competitions

Men's 56 kg at the 2010 Asian Games
- Venue: Lingnan Mingzhu Gymnasium
- Date: 16–26 November 2010
- Competitors: 23 from 23 nations

Medalists
gold medal	Worapoj Petchkoom	Thailand
silver medal	Zhang Jiawei	China
bronze medal	Ri Myong-son	North Korea
bronze medal	Wessam Salamana	Syria

The men's bantamweight (56 kilograms) event at the 2010 Asian Games took place from 16 to 26 November 2010 at Lingnan Mingzhu Gymnasium, Foshan, China.

== Schedule ==
All times are China Standard Time (UTC+08:00)

Date	Time	Event
Tuesday, 16 November 2010	19:00	Round of 32
Thursday, 18 November 2010	19:00	Round of 16
Sunday, 21 November 2010	19:00	Quarterfinals
Wednesday, 24 November 2010	19:00	Semifinals
Friday, 26 November 2010	19:00	Final

== Results ==
Legend

- RSC — Won by referee stop contest
- RSCO — Won by referee stop contest outscored
- WO — Won by walkover

=== Final ===
Final
Zhang Jiawei (CHN)	3
Worapoj Petchkoom (THA)	8

=== Top half ===
Round of 32

Round of 16
Naimat Ullah (PAK)
Orzubek Shayimov (UZB)	RSC
Zhang Jiawei (CHN)	6
Anvar Yunusov (TJK)	3
Abdullateef Sadiq (QAT)	1
Ri Myong-son (PRK)	5
Satoshi Shimizu (JPN)	7
Chhote Lal Yadav (IND)	4

Quarterfinals
Orzubek Shayimov (UZB)	2
Zhang Jiawei (CHN)	5
Ri Myong-son (PRK)	16
Satoshi Shimizu (JPN)	13

Semifinals
Zhang Jiawei (CHN)	RSC
Ri Myong-son (PRK)

=== Bottom half ===
Round of 32
Enkhjargalyn Iderkhüü (MGL)	9
Saman Silva (SRI)	2
Omran Akbari (IRI)	RSCO
Leong Chi Meng (MAC)
Naser Al-Enezi (IOC)
Allaberdi Işankulyýew (TKM)	WO
Daniyar Tulegenov (KAZ)	7
Charly Suarez (PHI)	1
Sigyel Phub (BHU)	5
Syimyk Abdyldabek Uulu (KGZ)	4
Lee Jin-young (KOR)	7
Khounthavisak Moneboudsady (LAO)	0
Otnel Baptista (TLS)	2
Wessam Salamana (SYR)	9

Round of 16
Worapoj Petchkoom (THA)	2
Enkhjargalyn Iderkhüü (MGL)	1
Omran Akbari (IRI)	10
Allaberdi Işankulyýew (TKM)	1
Daniyar Tulegenov (KAZ)	3
Sigyel Phub (BHU)	6
Lee Jin-young (KOR)	3
Wessam Salamana (SYR)	+3

Quarterfinals
Worapoj Petchkoom (THA)	4
Omran Akbari (IRI)	2
Sigyel Phub (BHU)	1
Wessam Salamana (SYR)	6

Semifinals
Worapoj Petchkoom (THA)	4
Wessam Salamana (SYR)	0
