= 2017 AIBA World Boxing Championships – Middleweight =

Boxing competitions

Middleweight at the 2017 AIBA World Boxing Championships
- Venue: Alsterdorfer Sporthalle
- Location: Hamburg, Germany
- Dates: 25 August–2 September
- Competitors: 25 from 25 nations

Medalists
gold medal	Oleksandr Khyzhniak	Ukraine
silver medal	Abilkhan Amankul	Kazakhstan
bronze medal	Kamran Shakhsuvarly	Azerbaijan
bronze medal	Troy Isley	United States

The Middleweight competition at the 2017 AIBA World Boxing Championships was held from 25 August to 2 September 2017.

== Draw ==
=== Final ===
Final
2 September
(Kazakhstan) Abilkhan Amankul	0
(Ukraine) Oleksandr Khyzhniak	5

=== Top half ===
First round
25 August
(Hungary) Zoltán Harcsa	1
(Italy) Salvatore Cavallaro	4
25 August
(Kazakhstan) Abilkhan Amankul	5
(Australia) Campbell Somerville	0
25 August
(Turkey) Birol Aygün	1
(Germany) Silvio Schierle	4
25 August
(Panama) Luis Hernández	0
(Colombia) Jorge Vivas	5
25 August
(Netherlands) Max van der Pas	3
(Guatemala) Lester Martínez	2

Second round
27 August
(Cuba) Arlen López	5
(Italy) Salvatore Cavallaro	0
27 August
(Kazakhstan) Abilkhan Amankul	5
(Germany) Silvio Schierle	0
27 August
(Russia) Petr Khamukov	2
(Colombia) Jorge Vivas	3
27 August
(Netherlands) Max van der Pas	2
(Azerbaijan) Kamran Shakhsuvarly	3

Quarterfinals
29 August
(Cuba) Arlen López	2
(Kazakhstan) Abilkhan Amankul	3
29 August
(Colombia) Jorge Vivas	2
(Azerbaijan) Kamran Shakhsuvarly	3

Semifinals
31 August
(Kazakhstan) Abilkhan Amankul	4
(Azerbaijan) Kamran Shakhsuvarly	1

=== Bottom half ===
First round
25 August
(Kenya) John Kyalo	0
(England) Benjamin Whittaker	5
25 August
(South Korea) Lee Dong-yun	0
(Slovakia) Andrej Csemez	5
25 August
(Puerto Rico) Luis Rodríguez	0
(Turkmenistan) Aziz Açylow	5
25 August
(United States) Troy Isley	w/o
(Cameroon) Seyi Dieudonne

Second round
27 August
(India) Vikas Krishan Yadav	0
(England) Benjamin Whittaker	5
27 August
(Slovakia) Andrej Csemez	0
(Ukraine) Oleksandr Khyzhniak	4
27 August
(Uzbekistan) Israil Madrimov	TKO
(Turkmenistan) Aziz Açylow
27 August
(United States) Troy Isley	5
(Egypt) Hosam Bakr Abdin	0

Quarterfinals
29 August
(England) Benjamin Whittaker	1
(Ukraine) Oleksandr Khyzhniak	4
29 August
(Uzbekistan) Israil Madrimov	2
(United States) Troy Isley	3

Semifinals
31 August
(Ukraine) Oleksandr Khyzhniak	4
(United States) Troy Isley	1
