= Boxing at the 2010 Asian Games – Men's 52 kg =

Asian Games Boxing competitions

Men's 52 kg at the 2010 Asian Games
- Venue: Lingnan Mingzhu Gymnasium
- Date: 16–25 November 2010
- Competitors: 22 from 22 nations

Medalists
gold medal	Rey Saludar	Philippines
silver medal	Chang Yong	China
bronze medal	Katsuaki Susa	Japan
bronze medal	Suranjoy Singh	India

The men's flyweight (52 kilograms) event at the 2010 Asian Games took place from 16 to 25 November 2010 at Lingnan Mingzhu Gymnasium, Foshan, China.

== Schedule ==
All times are China Standard Time (UTC+08:00)

Date	Time	Event
Tuesday, 16 November 2010	14:00	Round of 32
Thursday, 18 November 2010	14:00	Round of 16
Saturday, 20 November 2010	19:00	Quarterfinals
Wednesday, 24 November 2010	14:00	Semifinals
Thursday, 25 November 2010	19:00	Final

== Results ==
Legend

- KO — Won by knockout
- RSC — Won by referee stop contest

=== Final ===
Final
Rey Saludar (PHI)	13
Chang Yong (CHN)	11

=== Top half ===
Round of 32

Round of 16
Rey Saludar (PHI)	KO
Kinley Gyeltshen (BHU)
Puran Rai (NEP)	6
Artemio da Conceição (TLS)	1
Katsuaki Susa (JPN)	17
Leong Son Keong (MAC)	0
Nguyễn Văn Hải (VIE)	3
Lin Yu-che (TPE)	5

Quarterfinals
Rey Saludar (PHI)	RSC
Puran Rai (NEP)
Katsuaki Susa (JPN)	RSC
Lin Yu-che (TPE)

Semifinals
Rey Saludar (PHI)	13
Katsuaki Susa (JPN)	4

=== Bottom half ===
Round of 32
Mohammad Al-Wadi (JOR)	10
Sultan Al-Montashari (KSA)	2
Xayyaphone Chanthasone (LAO)	0
Pak Jong-chol (PRK)	4
Suresh Pattiarachchi (SRI)	1
Meder Mamakeev (KGZ)	7
Shahriyor Isakov (UZB)	9
Nyambayaryn Tögstsogt (MGL)	2
Suranjoy Singh (IND)	7
Chatchai Butdee (THA)	2
Miras Zhakupov (KAZ)	3
Kim Ju-seong (KOR)	5

Round of 16
Chang Yong (CHN)	14
Faruh Ýomudow (TKM)	0
Mohammad Al-Wadi (JOR)	2
Pak Jong-chol (PRK)	10
Meder Mamakeev (KGZ)	5
Shahriyor Isakov (UZB)	+5
Suranjoy Singh (IND)	8
Kim Ju-seong (KOR)	6

Quarterfinals
Chang Yong (CHN)	9
Pak Jong-chol (PRK)	5
Shahriyor Isakov (UZB)	2
Suranjoy Singh (IND)	4

Semifinals
Chang Yong (CHN)	6
Suranjoy Singh (IND)	5
