= Boxing at the 2010 Asian Games – Men's 69 kg =

Boxing competitions

Men's 69 kg at the 2010 Asian Games
- Venue: Lingnan Mingzhu Gymnasium
- Date: 17–25 November 2010
- Competitors: 22 from 22 nations

Medalists
gold medal	Serik Sapiyev	Kazakhstan
silver medal	Uktamjon Rahmonov	Uzbekistan
bronze medal	Maimaitituersun Qiong	China
bronze medal	Jargalyn Otgonjargal	Mongolia

The men's welterweight (69 kilograms) event at the 2010 Asian Games took place from 17 to 25 November 2010 at Lingnan Mingzhu Gymnasium, Foshan, China.

== Schedule ==
All times are China Standard Time (UTC+08:00)

Date	Time	Event
Wednesday, 17 November 2010	14:00	Round of 32
Saturday, 20 November 2010	19:00	Round of 16
Monday, 22 November 2010	19:00	Quarterfinals
Wednesday, 24 November 2010	14:00	Semifinals
Thursday, 25 November 2010	19:00	Final

== Results ==
Legend

- RSC — Won by referee stop contest
- RSCO — Won by referee stop contest outscored
- WO — Won by walkover

=== Final ===
Final
Uktamjon Rahmonov (UZB)	3
Serik Sapiyev (KAZ)	9

=== Top half ===
Round of 32

Round of 16
Omar Mamedşaýew (TKM)	8
Dilbag Singh (IND)	0
Uktamjon Rahmonov (UZB)	RSC
Trương Đình Hoàng (VIE)
Morteza Sepahvand (IRI)	RSC
Khaled Al-Azemi (IOC)
Maimaitituersun Qiong (CHN)	16
Jun Young-nam (KOR)	6

Quarterfinals
Omar Mamedşaýew (TKM)	4
Uktamjon Rahmonov (UZB)	10
Morteza Sepahvand (IRI)	6
Maimaitituersun Qiong (CHN)	13

Semifinals
Uktamjon Rahmonov (UZB)	14
Maimaitituersun Qiong (CHN)	10

=== Bottom half ===
Round of 32
Ahmed Al-Taramsi (PLE)
Arshad Hussain (PAK)	RSC
Wilfredo Lopez (PHI)	5
Suruz Bangali (BAN)	1
Maksat Alimbaev (KGZ)	1
Apichet Saensit (THA)	5
Chang Wei-jen (TPE)	13
Alex Tatontos (INA)	4
Huzam Nabaah (QAT)
Serik Sapiyev (KAZ)	RSCO
Ratna Bahadur Tamang (NEP)	2
Mohd Farkhan Haron (MAS)	5

Round of 16
Jargalyn Otgonjargal (MGL)	6
Najibullah Azimi (AFG)	1
Arshad Hussain (PAK)	5
Wilfredo Lopez (PHI)	12
Apichet Saensit (THA)	5
Chang Wei-jen (TPE)	10
Serik Sapiyev (KAZ)	RSC
Mohd Farkhan Haron (MAS)

Quarterfinals
Jargalyn Otgonjargal (MGL)	7
Wilfredo Lopez (PHI)	1
Chang Wei-jen (TPE)
Serik Sapiyev (KAZ)	WO

Semifinals
Jargalyn Otgonjargal (MGL)	5
Serik Sapiyev (KAZ)	10
