= 2011 Asian Amateur Boxing Championships =

Boxing competitions

2011 Asian Boxing Championships
- Host city: Incheon, South Korea
- Dates: 5–12 August 2011
- Main venue: Dowon Sports Arena

The 26th edition of the men's Asian Amateur Boxing Championships were held from August 5 to August 12, 2011 in Incheon, South Korea.

== Medal summary ==
| Event | Gold | Silver | Bronze |
|---|---|---|---|
| Light flyweight 49 kg | Shin Jong-hun; South Korea | Amandeep Singh; India | Asylbek Nazaraliev; Kyrgyzstan |
| Light flyweight 49 kg | Shin Jong-hun; South Korea | Amandeep Singh; India | Alisher Mahmudov; Uzbekistan |
| Flyweight; 52 kg | Chang Yong; China | Ilyas Suleimenov; Kazakhstan | Rey Saludar; Philippines |
| Flyweight; 52 kg | Chang Yong; China | Ilyas Suleimenov; Kazakhstan | Mohammad Al-Wadi; Jordan |
| Bantamweight; 56 kg | Anvar Yunusov; Tajikistan | Dorjnyambuugiin Otgondalai; Mongolia | Lee Jin-young; South Korea |
| Bantamweight; 56 kg | Anvar Yunusov; Tajikistan | Dorjnyambuugiin Otgondalai; Mongolia | Kao Chih-yuan; Chinese Taipei |
| Lightweight; 60 kg | Aydar Amirzakov; Kazakhstan | Liu Qiang; China | Madadi Nagzibekov; Tajikistan |
| Lightweight; 60 kg | Aydar Amirzakov; Kazakhstan | Liu Qiang; China | Abdilay Anarbay Uulu; Kyrgyzstan |
| Light welterweight 64 kg | Uranchimegiin Mönkh-Erdene; Mongolia | Park Sang-hyuk; South Korea | Kobiljon Bobodjanov; Uzbekistan |
| Light welterweight 64 kg | Uranchimegiin Mönkh-Erdene; Mongolia | Park Sang-hyuk; South Korea | Balwinder Beniwal; India |
| Welterweight; 69 kg | Maimaitituersun Qiong; China | Rustam Svayev; Kazakhstan | Byambyn Tüvshinbat; Mongolia |
| Welterweight; 69 kg | Maimaitituersun Qiong; China | Rustam Svayev; Kazakhstan | Nodirbek Kosimov; Uzbekistan |
| Middleweight; 75 kg | Shukhrat Abdullaev; Uzbekistan | Tömörkhuyagiin Chuluuntömör; Mongolia | Yang Yu-ting; Chinese Taipei |
| Middleweight; 75 kg | Shukhrat Abdullaev; Uzbekistan | Tömörkhuyagiin Chuluuntömör; Mongolia | Nursähet Pazzyýew; Turkmenistan |
| Light heavyweight 81 kg | Kim Hyeong-kyu; South Korea | Meng Fanlong; China | Arman Rysbek; Kazakhstan |
| Light heavyweight 81 kg | Kim Hyeong-kyu; South Korea | Meng Fanlong; China | Ahmad Teimat; Jordan |
| Heavyweight; 91 kg | Mohammad Ghossoun; Syria | Wang Xuanxuan; China | Paramjeet Samota; India |
| Heavyweight; 91 kg | Mohammad Ghossoun; Syria | Wang Xuanxuan; China | Mohammad Nouripour; Iran |
| Super heavyweight +91 kg | Doszhan Ospanov; Kazakhstan | Abdolmajid Sepahvandi; Iran | Mustafa Mahdi; Iraq |
| Super heavyweight +91 kg | Doszhan Ospanov; Kazakhstan | Abdolmajid Sepahvandi; Iran | Zhang Zhilei; China |

== Medal table ==
| Rank | Nation | Gold | Silver | Bronze | Total |
|---|---|---|---|---|---|
| 1 | China | 2 | 3 | 1 | 6 |
| 2 | Kazakhstan | 2 | 2 | 1 | 5 |
| 3 | South Korea | 2 | 1 | 1 | 4 |
| 4 | Mongolia | 1 | 2 | 1 | 4 |
| 5 | Uzbekistan | 1 | 0 | 3 | 4 |
| 6 | Tajikistan | 1 | 0 | 1 | 2 |
| 7 | Syria | 1 | 0 | 0 | 1 |
| 8 | India | 0 | 1 | 2 | 3 |
| 9 | Iran | 0 | 1 | 1 | 2 |
| 10 | Chinese Taipei | 0 | 0 | 2 | 2 |
| 10 | Jordan | 0 | 0 | 2 | 2 |
| 10 | Kyrgyzstan | 0 | 0 | 2 | 2 |
| 13 | Iraq | 0 | 0 | 1 | 1 |
| 13 | Philippines | 0 | 0 | 1 | 1 |
| 13 | Turkmenistan | 0 | 0 | 1 | 1 |
| Totals (15 entries) | | 10 | 10 | 20 | 40 |
