= Boxing at the 2010 Asian Games – Men's 60 kg =

Boxing competitions

Men's 60 kg at the 2010 Asian Games
- Venue: Lingnan Mingzhu Gymnasium
- Date: 17–25 November 2010
- Competitors: 22 from 22 nations

Medalists
gold medal	Vikas Krishan Yadav	India
silver medal	Hu Qing	China
bronze medal	Han Soon-chul	South Korea
bronze medal	Hurshid Tojibaev	Uzbekistan

The men's lightweight (60 kilograms) event at the 2010 Asian Games took place from 17 to 25 November 2010 at Lingnan Mingzhu Gymnasium, Foshan, China.

== Schedule ==
All times are China Standard Time (UTC+08:00)

Date	Time	Event
Wednesday, 17 November 2010	14:00	Round of 32
Friday, 19 November 2010	14:00	Round of 16
Sunday, 21 November 2010	19:00	Quarterfinals
Wednesday, 24 November 2010	14:00	Semifinals
Thursday, 25 November 2010	19:00	Final

== Results ==
Legend

- RSC — Won by referee stop contest

=== Final ===
Final
Hu Qing (CHN)	4
Vikas Krishan Yadav (IND)	5

=== Top half ===
Round of 32

Round of 16
Asylbek Talasbayev (KGZ)	6
Han Soon-chul (KOR)	11
Mahmoud Eshaish (JOR)	3
Samat Bashenov (KAZ)	8
Hu Qing (CHN)	9
Jewel Ahmed Jony (BAN)	0
Suraka Sabih (IRQ)	7
Dorjnyambuugiin Otgondalai (MGL)	16

Quarterfinals
Han Soon-chul (KOR)	11
Samat Bashenov (KAZ)	8
Hu Qing (CHN)	6
Dorjnyambuugiin Otgondalai (MGL)	2

Semifinals
Han Soon-chul (KOR)	7
Hu Qing (CHN)	10

=== Bottom half ===
Round of 32
Amangeldi Hudaýbergenow (TKM)	10
Nawaz Dad (PAK)	4
Sailom Adi (THA)	1
Vikas Krishan Yadav (IND)	8
Henrique Borges (TLS)
Hurshid Tojibaev (UZB)	RSC
Andy Sivongsack (LAO)	2
Phal Sophat (CAM)	13
Foroutan Golara (IRI)	RSC
Dinesh Shrestha (NEP)
Chencho Wangdi (BHU)	10
Wu Chi Kit (MAC)	2

Round of 16
Kim Chol-song (PRK)	7
Mohammed Abdulla (QAT)	5
Amangeldi Hudaýbergenow (TKM)	1
Vikas Krishan Yadav (IND)	8
Hurshid Tojibaev (UZB)	RSC
Phal Sophat (CAM)
Foroutan Golara (IRI)	13
Chencho Wangdi (BHU)	3

Quarterfinals
Kim Chol-song (PRK)	2
Vikas Krishan Yadav (IND)	4
Hurshid Tojibaev (UZB)	7
Foroutan Golara (IRI)	3

Semifinals
Vikas Krishan Yadav (IND)	7
Hurshid Tojibaev (UZB)	0
