= Nathan Lugo =

Colombian boxer (born 2004)

Personal information
- Nickname: Brickbuster
- Nationality: American
- Born: Nathan Victor Lugo; 22 June 2004 (age 22) Orlando, Florida, U.S.
- Weight: Super Middleweight

Boxing career
- Stance: Orthodox

Boxing record
- Total fights: 4
- Wins: 4
- Win by KO: 4

Nathan Lugo (born 22 June 2004) is an American professional boxer who currently competes in the super-middleweight division.

== Amateur career ==
Lugo was one of the most successful American amateur boxers. He captured the National title twenty three times and became the youngest boxer to qualify for the Olympic trials. He finished up with a record of 223-19 which included over 40 stoppage wins

== Professional career ==
Lugo made his pro debut against another undefeated prospect in Robert Lartigue. Lugo showed he was a level above and stopped Lartigue in just 93 seconds In his next fight Lugo fought against Ray Corona on the undercard of Terence Crawford vs Israil Madrimov. He stopped Corona in the second round In his fourth pro fight Lugo fought Austin Dulworth in his first six rounder. He knocked Dulworth out in the fifth round

4 fights	4 wins	0 losses
By knockout	4	0
By decision	0	0

No.	Result	Record	Opponent	Type	Round, time	Date	Location	Notes
4	Win	4–0	(United States) Austin Dulworth	TKO	5 (6), 2:47	9 May 2025	(United States) Red Owl Boxing Arena, Houston, Texas, U.S.	
3	Win	3–0	(Democratic Republic of the Congo) Mardoche Illunga	TKO	4 (4), 0:44	22 Nov 2024	(United States) Corey Studios at Corey Tower, Atlanta, Georgia, U.S.	
2	Win	2–0	(United States) Ray Corona	TKO	2 (4), 0:54	31 Jul 2024	(United States) Santa Monica Pier, Santa Monica, California, U.S.	
1	Win	1–0	(United States) Robert Lartigue	TKO	1 (4) 1:33	19 Apr 2024	(United States) Overtime Elite Arena, Atlanta, Georgia, U.S.	
