= Arshad Hussain =

Arshad Hussain may refer to:

- Arshad Hussain (boxer, born 1990), Pakistani boxer
- Arshad Hussain (boxer, born 1967), Pakistani boxer
- Arshad Hossain (born 2001), Bangladeshi field hockey player

== See also ==
- Arshad Hussain Shah, Pakistani jurist
