= Boxing at the 2019 Pan American Games – Men's 75 kg =

Men's Middleweight at the 2019 Pan American Games
- Venue: Miguel Grau Coliseum
- Dates: July 29 – August 2, 2019
- Competitors: 8 from 8 nations

Medalists
Gold medal	Arlen López	Cuba
Silver medal	Hebert Carvalho	Brazil
Bronze medal	Lesther Espino	Nicaragua
Bronze medal	Troy Isley	United States

The Men's middleweight competition of the boxing events at the 2019 Pan American Games in Lima, Peru, was held between the 29 of July and the 2 of August 2019 at the Miguel Grau Coliseum.

Like all Pan American boxing events, the competition is a straight single-elimination tournament. Both semifinal losers are awarded bronze medals, so no boxers compete again after their first loss. Bouts consist of a 3 rounds "10-point must" scoring system used in the pro game, where the winner of each round must be awarded 10 points and the loser a lesser amount, and the elimination of the padded headgear. Five judges scored each bout. The winner will be the boxer who scored the most at the end of the match.

== Results ==
=== Bracket ===
Quarterfinals; July 29, 2019
Arlen López (CUB)	4
Euri Cedeño (DOM)	1
Lesther Espino (NCA)	RSC
Aaron Prince (TRI)
Hebert Carvalho (BRA)	3
Francisco Verón (ARG)	2
Jorge Vivas (COL)	2
Troy Isley (USA)	3

Semifinals; July 30, 2019
Arlen López (CUB)	5
Lesther Espino (NCA)	0
Hebert Carvalho (BRA)	4
Troy Isley (USA)	1

Final; August 2, 2019
Arlen López (CUB)	5
Hebert Carvalho (BRA)	0
