= Boxing at the 2010 Asian Games – Women's 75 kg =

Boxing competitions

Women's 75 kg at the 2010 Asian Games
- Venue: Lingnan Mingzhu Gymnasium
- Date: 22–26 November 2010
- Competitors: 7 from 7 nations

Medalists
gold medal	Li Jinzi	China
silver medal	Erdenesoyolyn Undram	Mongolia
bronze medal	Seong Su-yeon	South Korea
bronze medal	Kavita Goyat	India

The women's middleweight (75 kilograms) event at the 2010 Asian Games took place from 22 to 26 November 2010 at Lingnan Mingzhu Gymnasium, Foshan, China.

== Schedule ==
All times are China Standard Time (UTC+08:00)

Date	Time	Event
Monday, 22 November 2010	14:00	Quarterfinals
Wednesday, 24 November 2010	14:00	Semifinals
Friday, 26 November 2010	19:00	Final

== Results ==
Legend

- RSC — Won by referee stop contest

Quarterfinals
Gulzat Musabaeva (KGZ)	3
Erdenesoyolyn Undram (MGL)	11
Marina Volnova (KAZ)	7
Kavita Goyat (IND)	8
Sudaporn Seesondee (THA)	2
Li Jinzi (CHN)	10

Semifinals
Seong Su-yeon (KOR)	3
Erdenesoyolyn Undram (MGL)	14
Kavita Goyat (IND)	1
Li Jinzi (CHN)	5

Final
Erdenesoyolyn Undram (MGL)
Li Jinzi (CHN)	RSC
