= Boxing at the 2010 Asian Games – Men's 81 kg =

Boxing competitions

Men's 81 kg at the 2010 Asian Games
- Venue: Lingnan Mingzhu Gymnasium
- Date: 17–25 November 2010
- Competitors: 12 from 12 nations

Medalists
gold medal	Elshod Rasulov	Uzbekistan
silver medal	Dinesh Kumar	India
bronze medal	Deepak Maharjan	Nepal
bronze medal	Meng Fanlong	China

The men's light heavyweight (81 kilograms) event at the 2010 Asian Games took place from 17 to 25 November 2010 at Lingnan Mingzhu Gymnasium, Foshan, China.

Like all Asian Games boxing events, the competition was a straight single-elimination tournament. A total of 12 men from 12 countries competed in this event, limited to fighters whose body weight was less than 81 kilograms.

All bouts consisted of three three-minute rounds. The boxers receive points for every successful punch they land on their opponent's head or upper body. The boxer with the most points at the end of the bouts wins.

Elshod Rasulov of Uzbekistan won the gold medal. He beat Dinesh Kumar from India 10–4 on points in the final bout at the Foshan Gymnasium in Guangzhou. Deepak Maharjan of Nepal and Meng Fanlong from China shared the bronze medal after losing in the semifinal.

Deepak Maharjan's bronze medal was Nepal's only medal in the Games.

== Schedule ==
All times are China Standard Time (UTC+08:00)

Date	Time	Event
Wednesday, 17 November 2010	19:00	Round of 16
Friday, 19 November 2010	14:00	Quarterfinals
Wednesday, 24 November 2010	14:00	Semifinals
Thursday, 25 November 2010	19:00	Final

== Results ==
Round of 16
Meng Fanlong (CHN)	10
Sandagsürengiin Erdenebayar (MGL)	0
Rasul Ýuldaşew (TKM)	1
Chingis Borbashev (KGZ)	8
Ehsan Rouzbahani (IRI)	9
Ahmad Teimat (JOR)	2
Elshod Rasulov (UZB)	5
Almat Serimov (KAZ)	2

Quarterfinals
Dinesh Kumar (IND)	10
Heo Jin-ho (KOR)	6
Deepak Maharjan (NEP)	4
Kriengkrai Sukkhum (THA)	0
Meng Fanlong (CHN)	24
Chingis Borbashev (KGZ)	4
Ehsan Rouzbahani (IRI)	1
Elshod Rasulov (UZB)	3

Semifinals
Dinesh Kumar (IND)	7
Deepak Maharjan (NEP)	1
Meng Fanlong (CHN)	1
Elshod Rasulov (UZB)	12

Final
Dinesh Kumar (IND)	4
Elshod Rasulov (UZB)	10
