= Boxing at the 2010 Asian Games – Men's 64 kg =

Boxing competitions

Men's 64 kg at the 2010 Asian Games
- Venue: Lingnan Mingzhu Gymnasium
- Date: 16–26 November 2010
- Competitors: 20 from 20 nations

Medalists
gold medal	Daniyar Yeleussinov	Kazakhstan
silver medal	V. Santhosh Kumar	India
bronze medal	Wuttichai Masuk	Thailand
bronze medal	Sanjarbek Rahmonov	Uzbekistan

The men's light welterweight (64 kilograms) event at the 2010 Asian Games took place from 16 to 26 November 2010 at Lingnan Mingzhu Gymnasium, Foshan, China.

== Schedule ==
All times are China Standard Time (UTC+08:00)

Date	Time	Event
Tuesday, 16 November 2010	19:00	Round of 32
Friday, 19 November 2010	19:00	Round of 16
Monday, 22 November 2010	19:00	Quarterfinals
Wednesday, 24 November 2010	19:00	Semifinals
Friday, 26 November 2010	19:00	Final

== Results ==
Legend

- RSCI — Won by referee stop contest injury

=== Final ===
Final
V. Santhosh Kumar (IND)	1
Daniyar Yeleussinov (KAZ)	16

=== Top half ===
Round of 32

Round of 16
Delfin Boholst (PHI)	1
Byambyn Tüvshinbat (MGL)	8
Khir Akyazlan Azmi (MAS)	1
V. Santhosh Kumar (IND)	6
Wuttichai Masuk (THA)	10
Shim Hyun-young (KOR)	5
Vinky Montolalu (INA)	8
Svay Ratha (CAM)	4

Quarterfinals
Byambyn Tüvshinbat (MGL)	3
V. Santhosh Kumar (IND)	+3
Wuttichai Masuk (THA)	4
Vinky Montolalu (INA)	2

Semifinals
V. Santhosh Kumar (IND)	5
Wuttichai Masuk (THA)	1

=== Bottom half ===
Round of 32
Aamir Khan (PAK)	5
Masatsugu Kawachi (JPN)	4
Hu Richabilige (CHN)	1
Ermek Sakenov (KGZ)	3
Abdulla Al-Hadi (QAT)	0
Sanjarbek Rahmonov (UZB)	6
Md Abdur Rahim (BAN)	0
Serdar Hudaýberdiýew (TKM)	6

Round of 16
Daniyar Yeleussinov (KAZ)	RSCI
Mohammad Maroof Islam (AFG)
Zuhair Zaki (KSA)	2
Houman Karami (IRI)	15
Aamir Khan (PAK)	4
Ermek Sakenov (KGZ)	13
Sanjarbek Rahmonov (UZB)	7
Serdar Hudaýberdiýew (TKM)	2

Quarterfinals
Daniyar Yeleussinov (KAZ)	12
Houman Karami (IRI)	0
Ermek Sakenov (KGZ)	2
Sanjarbek Rahmonov (UZB)	4

Semifinals
Daniyar Yeleussinov (KAZ)	6
Sanjarbek Rahmonov (UZB)	0
