= Boxing at the 2018 Asian Games – Men's 75 kg =

Boxing competitions

Men's 75 kg at the 2018 Asian Games
- Venue: Jakarta International Expo
- Date: 25 August – 1 September 2018
- Competitors: 17 from 17 nations

Medalists
gold medal	Israil Madrimov	Uzbekistan
silver medal	Abilkhan Amankul	Kazakhstan
bronze medal	Vikas Krishan Yadav	India
bronze medal	Eumir Marcial	Philippines

The men's middleweight (75 kilograms) event at the 2018 Asian Games took place from 25 August to 1 September 2018 at Jakarta International Expo Hall, Jakarta, Indonesia.

== Schedule ==
All times are Western Indonesia Time (UTC+07:00)

Date	Time	Event
Saturday, 25 August 2018	18:00	Round of 32
Monday, 27 August 2018	13:00	Round of 16
Wednesday, 29 August 2018	13:00	Quarterfinals
Friday, 31 August 2018	18:00	Semifinals
Saturday, 1 September 2018	14:00	Final

== Results ==
Legend

- RSC — Won by referee stop contest
- WO — Won by walkover

=== Final ===
Final
Abilkhan Amankul (KAZ)	2
Israil Madrimov (UZB)	3

=== Top half ===
Round of 32
Yuito Moriwaki (JPN)	2
Aphisit Khankhokkhruea (THA)	3

Round of 16
Abilkhan Amankul (KAZ)	5
Aphisit Khankhokkhruea (THA)	0
Kan Chia-wei (TPE)	5
Deepak Shrestha (NEP)	0
Tanveer Ahmed (PAK)	0
Vikas Krishan Yadav (IND)	5
Nursähet Pazzyýew (TKM)	1
Tuohetaerbieke Tanglatihan (CHN)	4

Quarterfinals
Abilkhan Amankul (KAZ)	5
Kan Chia-wei (TPE)	0
Vikas Krishan Yadav (IND)	3
Tuohetaerbieke Tanglatihan (CHN)	2

Semifinals
Abilkhan Amankul (KAZ)	WO
Vikas Krishan Yadav (IND)

=== Bottom half ===
Round of 32

Round of 16
Brama Hendra Betaubun (INA)
Kim Jin-jea (KOR)	RSC
Ng Kuok Kun (MAC)
Eumir Marcial (PHI)	RSC
Shahin Mousavi (IRI)	5
Ahmad Ghossoun (SYR)	0
Davaasürengiin Davaanyam (MGL)	0
Israil Madrimov (UZB)	5

Quarterfinals
Kim Jin-jea (KOR)	0
Eumir Marcial (PHI)	5
Shahin Mousavi (IRI)	0
Israil Madrimov (UZB)	5

Semifinals
Eumir Marcial (PHI)	2
Israil Madrimov (UZB)	3
