= Abilkhan Amankul =

Kazakhstani boxer (born 1997)

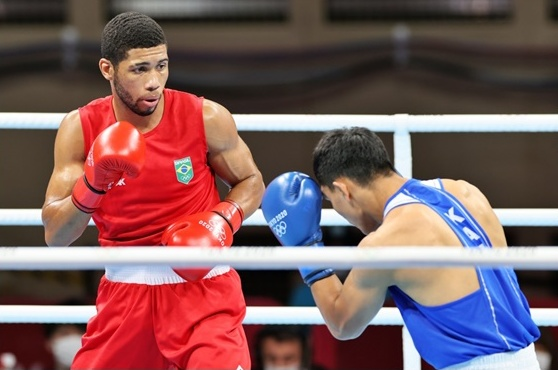

Personal information
- Native name: Әбілxан Бекмұратұлы Аманқұл
- Full name: Abilkhan Bekmuratovich Amankul
- Nationality: Kazakh
- Born: 29 July 1997 (age 29) Taraz, Kazakhstan
- Height: 176 cm (5 ft 9 in)
- Weight: 75 kg (165 lb)

Sport
- Country: Kazakhstan
- Sport: Boxing
- Event: Middleweight
- Club: Astana Arlans
- Coached by: Myrzagali Aitzhanov (national); Nurlan Akurpekov (personal)
Medal record
Men's boxing
Representing Kazakhstan
World Championships
Silver medal – second place	2017 Hamburg	Middleweight
Asian Championships
Silver medal – second place	2021 Dubai	Middleweight
Bronze medal – third place	2017 Tashkent	Middleweight
Asian Games
Silver medal – second place	2018 Jakarta-Palembang	Middleweight
- Updated on 1 September 2018

Abilkhan Amankul (Kazakh: Әбілxан Аманқұл, Äbılhan Amanqūl; born 29 July 1997) is a Kazakh middleweight amateur boxer. He competed in the middleweight event at the 2020 Summer Olympics.

== Career ==
Amankul was a boxing bronze medallist in the men's middleweight category at the 2017 Asian Amateur Boxing Championships after being narrowly defeated by Israil Madrimov of Uzbekistan in the semi-finals.

At the 2017 AIBA World Boxing Championships, he beat Campbell Somerville, Silvio Schierle, Olympic and World Champion Arlen López and Kamran Shakhsuvarly. Amankul losing to Oleksandr Khyzhniak of Ukraine in the gold medal match.

Abilkhan started the 2018 Asian Games with 5–0 win over Aphisit Khankhokkhruea of the Thailand in the first round, and in quarterfinals Amankul wins 5-0 Kan Chia-wei of Taipei and semifinals he wins India's Vikas Yadav unfortunately has been forced to pull out of the semi-final bout as he has been declared medically unfit due to an injury. Vikas will settle for a bronze. Amankul advanced to the final. In the final, Abilkhan fight Israil Madrimov of Uzbekistan and he lost 3-2 and the silver medal. Amankul to compete at the 2020 Olympic Games in Tokyo.

=== Results ===
==== 2017 Asian Championships ====
Amankul won Bronze in the Asian Championships at Middleweight. Results were:

- (China) Yinhang Wen: Won (5:0)
- (Syria) Abdul Mouen Azziz: Won (TKO)
- (Uzbekistan) Israil Madrimov: Lost (5:0)

==== 2017 World Championships ====
Amankul won Silver in the World Championships at Middleweight. Results were:

- (Australia) Campbell Somerville: Won (5:0)
- (Germany) Silvio Schierle: Won (5:0)
- (Cuba) Arlen López: Won (3:2)
- (Azerbaijan) Kamran Shakhsuvarly: Won (4:1)
- (Ukraine) Oleksandr Khyzhniak: Lost (5:0)

==== 2018 Asian Games ====
Amankul won Silver in the Asian Games at Middleweight. Results were:

- (Thailand) Aphisit Khankhokkhruea: Won (5:0)
- (Chinese Taipei) Kan Chia-wei: Won (5:0)
- (India) Vikas Yadav: Won (WO)
- (Uzbekistan) Israil Madrimov: Lost (3:2)

=== Debut Pro Fight ===
- (United States) Devontae McDonald: Won by TKO (R3)
