= Troy Isley =

American boxer (born 1998)

Personal information
- Nickname: Transformer
- Born: September 5, 1998 (age 27) Washington, D.C., U.S.
- Height: 5 ft 10 in (178 cm)
- Weight: Middleweight

Boxing career
- Reach: 69 1/2 in (177 cm)
- Stance: Orthodox

Boxing record
- Total fights: 17
- Wins: 17
- Win by KO: 6
Medal record
Men's amateur boxing
Representing United States
World Championships
Bronze medal – third place	2017 Hamburg	Middleweight
Pan American Games
Bronze medal – third place	2019 Lima	Middleweight

Troy Isley (born September 5, 1998) is an American professional boxer. As an amateur, he won a bronze medal at both the 2017 World Championships and 2019 Pan American Games. As an amateur, he trained at the Alexandria Boxing Club.

== Amateur career ==
=== Olympic result ===
Tokyo 2020

- Round of 32: Defeated Vitali Bandarenka (Belarus) 5–0
- Round of 16: Defeated by Gleb Bakshi (Russia) 3–2

=== World Championships result ===
Hamburg 2017

- Round of 16: Defeated Hosam Bakr Abdin (Egypt) 5–0
- Quarter-finals: Defeated Israil Madrimov (Uzbekistan) 3–2
- Semi-finals: Defeated by Oleksandr Khyzhniak (Ukraine) 4–1

=== Pan American Games result ===
Lima 2019

- Quarter-finals: Defeated Jorge Vivas (Colombia) 3–2
- Semi-finals: Defeated by Hebert Conceição (Brazil) 4–1

== Professional career ==
On January 19, 2021 it was announced that Isley had signed a promotional contract with Top Rank where he would be promoted by Bob Arum. Isley made his professional debut on February 13, 2021, scoring a unanimous decision victory against Bryant Costello.

On January 15, 2022 Isley faced Harry Keenan Cruz Cubano on the undercard of Joe Smith Jr. vs Steve Geffrard at the Turning Stone Resort Casino in Verona, New York. In a bout which saw Isley receive a point deduction in round six for repeated low blows, he went on win via UD with two judges scoring the bout 59–54 and the third scoring it 59–53.

On March 2, 2024 Isley defeated Marcos Hernandez by TKO in the seventh round in Verona, New York. He defeated Javier Martínez at Fontainebleau Las Vegas on June 21, 2024.

Isley was scheduled to face Tyler Howard in a 10-round middleweight bout on November 8, 2024, at Scope Arena in Norfolk, Virginia. He won by unanimous decision.

On August 15, 2026, he defeated Joseph Hicks via unanimous decision at State Farm Arena in Atlanta, Georgia.

== Professional boxing record ==
17 fights	17 wins	0 losses
By knockout	6	0
By decision	11	0

No.	Result	Record	Opponent	Type	Round, time	Date	Location	Notes
17	Win	17-0	(United States) Joseph Hicks	UD	10	Aug 15, 2026	(United States) State Farm Arena, Atlanta, Georgia, U.S.	
16	Win	16-0	(Spain) Leonardo Di Stefano	TKO	0:55}}	Jun 14, 2026	(United States) GLC Live at 20 Monroe, Grand Rapids, Michigan, U.S.	
15	Win	15-0	(United States) Etoundi Michel William	UD	10	Jun 7, 2025	(United States) Scope Arena, Norfolk, Virginia, U.S.	Retained NABO middleweight title
14	Win	14-0	(United States) Tyler Howard	UD	10	Nov 8, 2024	(United States) Scope Arena, Norfolk, Virginia, U.S.	Retained NABO middleweight title
13	Win	13-0	(United States) Javier Martinez	UD	10	Jun 21, 2024	(United States) Fontainebleau Las Vegas, Las Vegas, Nevada, U.S.	Won NABO middleweight title
12	Win	12-0	(United States) Marcos Hernandez	TKO	1:30}}	Mar 2, 2024	(United States) Turning Stone Resort & Casino, Verona, New York, U.S.	
11	Win	11–0	(Mexico) Vladimir Hernandez	UD	8	Nov 16, 2023	(United States) T-Mobile Arena, Las Vegas, Nevada, USA	
10	Win	10–0	(United States) Antonio Todd	UD	8	Jul 22, 2023	(United States) Firelake Arena, Shawnee, Oklahoma, U.S.	
9	Win	9–0	(United States) Roy Barringer	UD	8	Apr 8, 2023	(United States) Prudential Center, Newark, New Jersey, U.S.	
8	Win	8–0	(United States) Quincy LaVallais	UD	6	Oct 29, 2022	(United States) Hulu Theater, New York City, New York, U.S.	
7	Win	7–0	(United States) Victor Toney	UD	6	Aug 13, 2022	(United States) Resorts World Las Vegas, Winchester, Nevada, U.S.	
6	Win	6–0	(United States) Donte Stubbs	TKO	6 (6), 0:38	Jun 18, 2022	(United States) Hulu Theater, New York City, New York, U.S.	
5	Win	5–0	(United States) Anthony Hannah	TKO	2 (6), 2:33	Apr 30, 2022	(United States) MGM Grand Conference Center, Paradise, Nevada, U.S.	
4	Win	4–0	(Puerto Rico) Harry Keenan Cruz Cubano	UD	6	Jan 15, 2022	(United States) Turning Stone Resort Casino, Verona, New York, U.S.	
3	Win	3–0	(United States) Nicholi Navarro	TKO	1 (4), 2:44	Oct 23, 2021	(United States) State Farm Arena, Atlanta, Georgia, U.S.	
2	Win	2–0	(United States) LaQuan Evans	TKO	4 (4), 2:26	Jun 12, 2021	(United States) Virgin Hotels Las Vegas, Paradise, Nevada, U.S.	
1	Win	1–0	(United States) Bryant Costello	UD	4	Feb 13, 2021	(United States) MGM Grand Conference Center, Paradise, Nevada, U.S.	
