= Boxing at the 2010 Asian Games – Women's 60 kg =

Boxing competitions

Women's 60 kg at the 2010 Asian Games
- Venue: Lingnan Mingzhu Gymnasium
- Date: 21–26 November 2010
- Competitors: 14 from 14 nations

Medalists
gold medal	Dong Cheng	China
silver medal	Tassamalee Thongjan	Thailand
bronze medal	Yun Kum-ju	North Korea
bronze medal	Saida Khassenova	Kazakhstan

The women's lightweight (60 kilograms) event at the 2010 Asian Games took place from 21 to 26 November 2010 at Lingnan Mingzhu Gymnasium, Foshan, China.

Like all Asian Games boxing events, the competition was a straight single-elimination tournament.

A total of 14 women from 14 countries competed in this event, limited to fighters whose body weight was less than 60 kilograms. Dong Cheng of China won the gold medal. She beat Tassamalee Thongjan of Thailand 13–4 in the final bout in Foshan Gymnasium. Yun Kum-ju and Saida Khassenova shared the bronze medal.

== Schedule ==
All times are China Standard Time (UTC+08:00)

Date	Time	Event
Sunday, 21 November 2010	14:00	Round of 16
Monday, 22 November 2010	14:00	Quarterfinals
Wednesday, 24 November 2010	14:00	Semifinals
Friday, 26 November 2010	19:00	Final

== Results ==
Legend

- RSC — Won by referee stop contest
- RSCI — Won by referee stop contest injury

Round of 16
Tomoko Kugimiya (JPN)	7
Kseniia Filisteeva (KGZ)	15
Dong Cheng (CHN)	RSC
Park Jin-a (KOR)
Preeti Beniwal (IND)	8
Oyuungereliin Suvd-Erdene (MGL)	2
Tassamalee Thongjan (THA)	8
Niranjala Senanayake (SRI)	0
Saida Khassenova (KAZ)	10
Mavzuna Chorieva (TJK)	4
Hsueh Chun-chiu (TPE)	6
Anuradha Lama (NEP)	0

Quarterfinals
Yun Kum-ju (PRK)	10
Ngô Thị Chung (VIE)	1
Kseniia Filisteeva (KGZ)	0
Dong Cheng (CHN)	18
Preeti Beniwal (IND)
Tassamalee Thongjan (THA)	RSCI
Saida Khassenova (KAZ)	9
Hsueh Chun-chiu (TPE)	2

Semifinals
Yun Kum-ju (PRK)	2
Dong Cheng (CHN)	7
Tassamalee Thongjan (THA)	8
Saida Khassenova (KAZ)	3

Final
Dong Cheng (CHN)	13
Tassamalee Thongjan (THA)	4
