= Odai Al-Hindawi =

Jordanian boxer (born 1991)

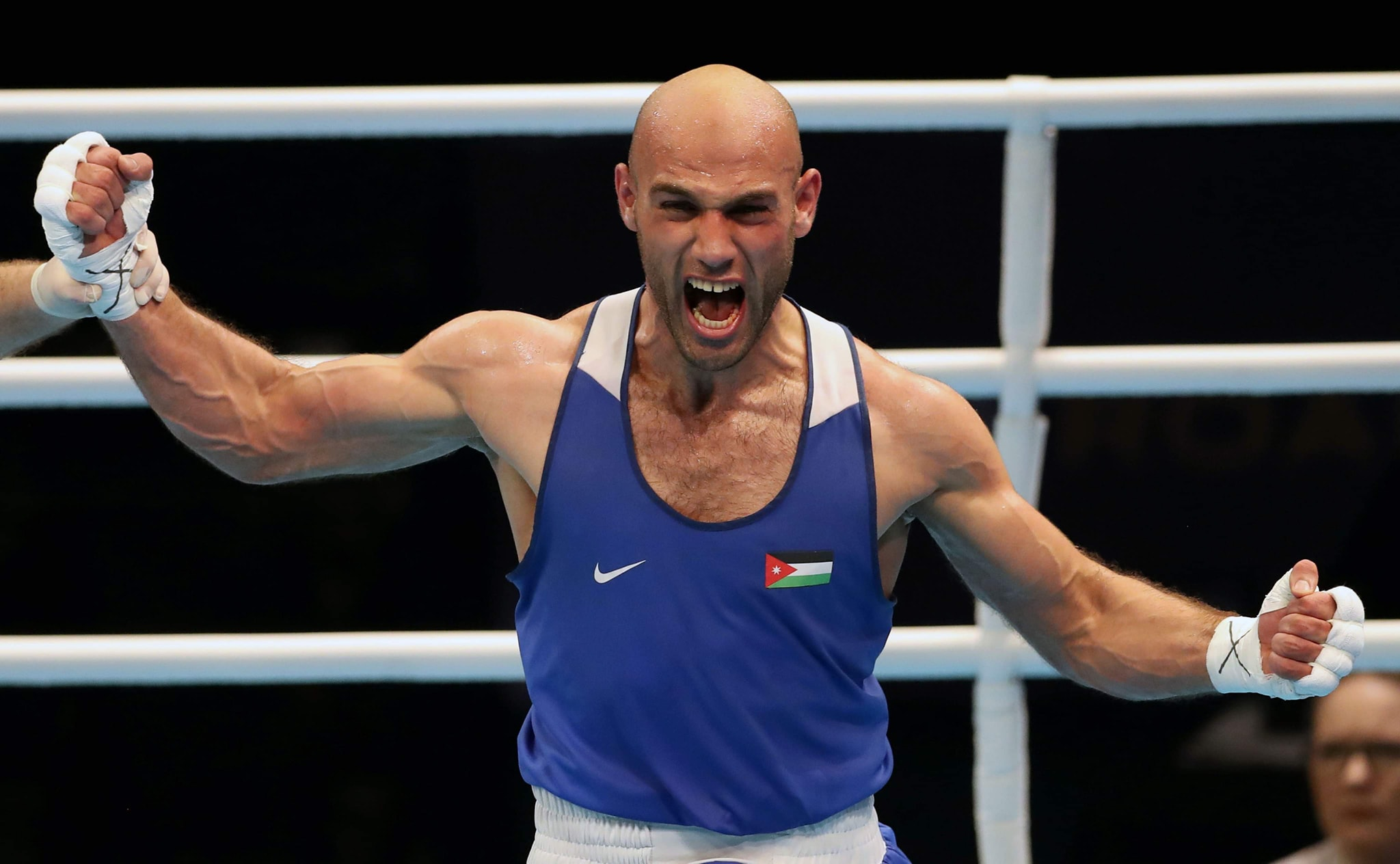

Personal information
- Nationality: Jordanian
- Born: Odai Riyad Adel Al-Hindawi; 28 July 1991 (age 35) Irbid, Jordan
- Weight: Middleweight; Light heavyweight; Heavyweight

Boxing career
Medal record
Men's amateur boxing
Representing Jordan
Asian Games
Silver medal – second place	2014 Incheon	Middleweight
Asian Championships
Silver medal – second place	2022 Amman	Cruiserweight
Arab Championships
Bronze medal – third place	2018 Khartoum	Light heavyweight

Odai Al-Hindawi (Arabic: عدي الهنداوي; born 28 July 1991) is a Jordanian amateur boxer. He competed at the 2019 World Championships and later qualified for the 2020 Summer Olympics, both at light heavyweight. He also won a middleweight silver medal at the 2014 Asian Games.

== Career ==
Al-Hindawi's first major international tournament was the 2013 Asian Championships, which were held in Jordan. He lost his first match against Yang Yu-Ting of Taiwan.

Al-Hindawi earned a silver medal in the middleweight event at the 2014 Asian Games in South Korea, losing to 2013 World Champion Janibek Alimkhanuly in the finals. For his performances, he was nominated as a finalist for the Black Iris award for the Jordanian sportsman of the year.

In 2018, Al-Hindawi won a bronze medal at the Arab Championships in April before winning gold at the International Elite Boxing Tournament in Algeria the following month. He also made an appearance at the 2019 World Championships in Russia, losing to Sammy Lee by unanimous decision in the first round.

Al-Hindawi participated in the 2020 Asia & Oceania Qualification Tournament held in Jordan, where he defeated Jolando Taala of American Samoa and Jakkapong Yomkhot of Thailand in his first two bouts. Although he lost to 2019 World Champion Bekzad Nurdauletov in the semifinals, his two previous victories secured his spot at the 2020 Summer Olympics. This was Al-Hindawi's third attempt at Olympic qualification, having previously suffered early exits at the 2012 and 2016 qualifiers.

Al-Hindawi has won national championships in 2010, 2012, 2014, 2015, and 2018.
