= Boxing at the 2015 Pan American Games – Men's middleweight =

Men's middleweight at the 2015 Pan American Games
- Venue: Oshawa Sports Centre
- Dates: July 18–24
- Competitors: 10 from 10 nations

Medalists
Gold medal	Arlen López	Cuba
Silver medal	Jorge Vivas	Colombia
Bronze medal	Misael Rodríguez	Mexico
Bronze medal	Endry Saavedra	Venezuela

The men's middleweight competition of the boxing events at the 2015 Pan American Games in Toronto, Ontario, Canada, was held between the 18 and 24 of July at the Oshawa Sports Centre. The defending champion is Emilio Correa of Cuba. Middleweights is limited to those boxers weighing less than or equal to 75 kilograms.

Like all Pan American boxing events, the competition is a straight single-elimination tournament. Both semifinal losers are awarded bronze medals, so no boxers compete again after their first loss. Bouts consist of a 3 rounds "10-point must" scoring system used in the pro game, where the winner of each round must be awarded 10 points and the loser a lesser amount, and the elimination of the padded headgear. Five judges scored each bout. The winner will be the boxer who scored the most at the end of the match.

== Qualification ==
A total of ten boxers qualified to compete.

== Results ==
=== Bracket ===
Preliminaries; July 18, 2015
Magdiel Cotto (PUR)	0
Raúl Sánchez (DOM)	3
Clovis Drolet (CAN)	1
Jason Ramírez (CRC)	2

Quarterfinals; July 20, 2015
Jorge Vivas (COL)	2
Raúl Sánchez (DOM)	1
Misael Rodríguez (MEX)	3
Anthony Campbell (USA)	0
Endry Saavedra (VEN)	3
Joseph Cherkashyn (CHI)	0
Jason Ramírez (CRC)	0
Arlen López (CUB)	3

Semifinals; July 22, 2015
Jorge Vivas (COL)	2
Misael Rodríguez (MEX)	1
Endry Saavedra (VEN)	0
Arlen López (CUB)	3

Finals; July 24, 2015
Jorge Vivas (COL)	0
Arlen López (CUB)	3
