= Boxing at the 2010 Asian Games – Women's 51 kg =

Boxing competitions

Women's 51 kg at the 2010 Asian Games
- Venue: Lingnan Mingzhu Gymnasium
- Date: 21–25 November 2010
- Competitors: 13 from 13 nations

Medalists
gold medal	Ren Cancan	China
silver medal	Annie Albania	Philippines
bronze medal	Mary Kom	India
bronze medal	Aya Shinmoto	Japan

The women's flyweight (51 kilograms) event at the 2010 Asian Games took place from 21 to 25 November 2010 at Lingnan Mingzhu Gymnasium, Foshan, China.

Like all Asian Games boxing events, the competition was a straight single-elimination tournament. This was the first ever women's boxing tournament in the history of the Asian Games.

A total of 13 women from 13 countries competed, limited to fighters whose body weight was less than 51 kilograms. Ren Cancan of China won the gold medal. She beat Annie Albania of the Philippines 7–5 in the final bout in Foshan Gymnasium. Mary Kom and Aya Shinmoto shared the bronze medal.

Ren Cancan became the first ever women's boxing champion at the Asian Games.

== Schedule ==
All times are China Standard Time (UTC+08:00)

Date	Time	Event
Sunday, 21 November 2010	14:00	Round of 16
Monday, 22 November 2010	14:00	Quarterfinals
Wednesday, 24 November 2010	19:00	Semifinals
Thursday, 25 November 2010	19:00	Final

== Results ==
Legend

- RSC — Won by referee stop contest

Round of 16
Jang Eun-a (KOR)	1
Ren Cancan (CHN)	8
Kim Hye-song (PRK)	8
Peamwilai Laopeam (THA)	4
Annie Albania (PHI)	9
Zhaina Shekerbekova (KAZ)	2
Aya Shinmoto (JPN)	8
Myagmardulamyn Nandintsetseg (MGL)	4
Mak Kit I (MAC)
Nguyễn Thị Tuyết Mai (VIE)	RSC

Quarterfinals
Mary Kom (IND)	16
Ping Meng-chieh (TPE)	2
Sanju Lama (NEP)	0
Ren Cancan (CHN)	10
Kim Hye-song (PRK)	2
Annie Albania (PHI)	7
Aya Shinmoto (JPN)	9
Nguyễn Thị Tuyết Mai (VIE)	3

Semifinals
Mary Kom (IND)	7
Ren Cancan (CHN)	11
Annie Albania (PHI)	16
Aya Shinmoto (JPN)	1

Final
Ren Cancan (CHN)	7
Annie Albania (PHI)	5
