= Bhutan at the 2010 Asian Games =

- IOC code: BHU
- NOC: Bhutan Olympic Committee

in Guangzhou
- Competitors: 11 in 2 sports
- Medals Ranked 37th: Gold 0 Silver 0 Bronze 0 Total 0

Asian Games appearances (overview)
- 1986; 1990; 1994; 1998; 2002; 2006; 2010; 2014; 2018; 2022; 2026

Bhutan participated at the 16th Asian Games in Guangzhou, China. It did not win any medals.

== Boxing ==
=== Men ===
Athlete	Event	Round of 32	Round of 16	Quarterfinals	Semifinals	Final
Athlete	Event	Opposition Result	Opposition Result	Opposition Result	Opposition Result	Opposition Result
Kinley Gyeltshen	Flyweight	BYE	Rey Saludar (CHN); L KO R1 1:34	did not advance		
Sigyel Phub	Bantamweight	Syimyk Abdyldabek Ulu (KGZ); W PTS 5-4	Daniyar Tulegenov (KAZ); W PTS 6-3	Wessam Salamana (SYR); L PTS 1-6	did not advance	
Chencho Wangdi	Lightweight	Chi Kit Wu (MAC); W PTS 10-2	Forootan Golara (IRI); L PTS 3-13	did not advance		

== Taekwondo ==
=== Men ===
Athlete	Event	Round of 32	Round of 16	Quarterfinals	Semifinals	Final
Athlete	Event	Opposition Result	Opposition Result	Opposition Result	Opposition Result	Opposition Result
Lakpa Tashi Sherpa	Finweight (-54kg)	Kumar Sunil (IND); L PTS 5-12	did not advance			
Tshewang Tshewang	Flyweight (-58kg)	Yongzeng Xu (CHN); L PTS 5-9	did not advance			
Tandin Dendup	Bantamweight (-63kg)	BYE	Nacha Punthong (THA); L RSC Round3 2:00	did not advance		
Kusung Wangdi	Lightweight (-74kg)	BYE	Patiwat Thongsalup (THA); L PTS 3-8	did not advance		
Tashi Tashi	Welterweight (-80kg)	BYE	Lin Zhao (CHN); L PTS 6-9	did not advance		
Sonam Penjor	Middleweight (-87kg)	BYE	Zhimeng Yin (CHN); L PTS 0-8	did not advance		

=== Women ===
Athlete	Event	Round of 32	Round of 16	Quarterfinals	Semifinals	Final
Athlete	Event	Opposition Result	Opposition Result	Opposition Result	Opposition Result	Opposition Result
Tandin Dema	Finweight (-46kg)	BYE	Buttree Puedpong (THA); L PTS 1-19	did not advance		
Kezang Lhamo	Featherweight (-57kg)	BYE	Shantibala Devi Y (IND); L PTS 0-7	did not advance		
