= Hurshid Tojibaev =

Uzbekistani boxer (born 1989)

Khurshid Tojibaev
Personal information
- Nationality: Uzbek
- Born: Dzhizak, Uzbekistan
- Height: 5 ft 7.5 in (171 cm)

Boxing career
- Weight class: Super Featherweight
- Stance: Orthodox

Boxing record
- Total fights: 6
- Wins: 6
- Win by KO: 3

Khurshid Tadjibayev/Hoorshid Tojibaev (13 November 1989) is an Uzbekistani professional and former amateur boxer who competed at bantamweight at the 2008 Olympics and at lightweight at the 2016 Olympics.

He qualified for the 2008 Olympics by beating fighters like Han Soon Chul. In Beijing, he upset German veteran Rustamhodza Rahimov 11:2 but lost to Bruno Julie from Mauritius 4:16.

Tojibaev continued his boxing career after the 2008 Olympics, earning a bronze medal at lightweight at the 2010 Asian Games in China. There, he won his opening three bouts (two by TKO) before losing a decision to India's Vikas Krishan Yadav, who went on to win the gold.

Tojibaev went on to compete with mixed success in the World Series of Boxing (WSB) and with great success in AIBA professional boxing (APB). He won the 60kg APB World Championship by avenging a loss to champion Berik Abdrakhmanov, who had previously won gold at the Asian Championships and bronze at the World Championships. In the APB, Tojibaev also posted victories over future Olympian, Charly Suarez, and future Olympic gold medalist, Robson Conceição. As APB champion, Tojibaev automatically qualified for the 2016 Olympics in Rio.

In Rio, he scored victories over Hakan Erşeker of Qatar and hot prospect Joe Cordina of Great Britain, before dropping a close decision in a rematch with Brazil's Conceicao, who eventually won the gold medal.

After the 2016 Olympics, Tojibaev turned professional.

== Professional boxing record ==
6 fights	6 wins	0 losses
By knockout	3	0
By decision	3	0

No.	Result	Record	Opponent	Type	Round, time	Date	Location	Notes
6	Win	6–0	Pavel Malikov	TD	4 (8), 2:33	11 Dec 2021	CSKA Sport Complex, Almaty, Kazakhstan	
5	Win	5–0	Achiko Odikadze	KO	5 (8), 0:57	20 Aug 2021	Conrad Dubai, Dubai, UAE	
4	Win	4–0	Isack Junior	UD	6	16 Dec 2019	Baluan Sholak Sports Palace, Almaty, Kazakhstan	
3	Win	3–0	Ivor Lastrilla	RTD	4 (8), 3:00	12 Oct 2019	Grand Park, Almaty, Kazakhstan	
2	Win	2–0	Irakli Shariashvili	UD	6	18 May 2019	Viby Hallen, Aarhus, Denmark	
1	Win	1–0	Krzysztof Rogowski	TKO	3 (6), 2:07	23 Mar 2019	Hala Sportowa im. Olimpijczykow, ul. Ksieznej Anny 18, Lomza, Poland	
