= Syria at the 2010 Asian Games =

- IOC code: SYR
- NOC: Syrian Olympic Committee

in Guangzhou
- Competitors: 47
- Medals Ranked 29th: Gold 1 Silver 0 Bronze 1 Total 2

Asian Games appearances (overview)
- 1951; 1954; 1958; 1962; 1966; 1970; 1974; 1978; 1982; 1986; 1990; 1994; 1998; 2002; 2006; 2010; 2014; 2018; 2022; 2026

Syria participated in the 2010 Asian Games in Guangzhou from 12 November to 27 November 2010. It won 1 gold and 1 bronze medal.

== Medalists ==
Medal	Name	Sport	Event	Date
Gold	Mohammad Ghossoun	Boxing	Men's Heavyweight 91 kg	26 November
Bronze	Wessam Salamana	Boxing	Men's Bantamweight 56 kg	24 November
