= Dong Cheng (boxer) =

Chinese boxer (born 1986)

Personal information
- Nationality: China
- Born: 14 August 1986 (age 39) Tianmen, Hubei, China
- Height: 5 ft 9.6 in (1.77 m)

Sport
- Sport: Boxing
- Weight class: Lightweight
- Club: Ch
- Coached by: Yang Zhiwei
Medal record
Representing China
Women's boxing
Summer Olympics 5th Position
Women's World Amateur Boxing Championships
Silver medal – second place	2010 Bridgetown	60 kg
Silver medal – second place	2008 Ningbo City	60 kg
Asian Women's Boxing Championship
Bronze medal – third place	2012 Ulaanbaatar	60 kg
Bronze medal – third place	2010 Astana	60 kg
Bronze medal – third place	2008 Guwahati	60 kg
Asian Games
Gold medal – first place	2010 Guangzhou	60kg
Asian Indoor Games
Gold medal – first place	2009 Hanoi	60 kg
Asian Cup Women's Boxing Tournament
Gold medal – first place	2011 Haikou	60 kg
Olympic Test Event
Silver medal – second place	2011 London	60 kg

Dong Cheng (Chinese: 董程; pinyin: Dǒng Chéng; born August 14, 1986) is a Chinese female boxer who competes in the lightweight (60 kg) division.

At the 2012 Summer Olympics, she reached the quarterfinals by beating Mihaela Lacatus, before losing to Mavzuna Chorieva.

== See also ==
- China at the 2012 Summer Olympics - Boxing
  - Boxing at the 2012 Summer Olympics – Women's lightweight
