= Katsuaki Susa =

Japanese boxer

Personal information
- Full name: Katsuaki Susa
- Nationality: Japanese
- Born: September 13, 1984 (age 41) Aizuwakamatsu, Fukushima
- Height: 1.63 m (5 ft 4 in)

Sport
- Sport: Boxing
- Weight class: Flyweight
- Club: Japan Self-Defense Forces
Medal record
Asian Games
Bronze medal – third place	2006 Doha	Flyweight
Bronze medal – third place	2010 Guangzhou	Flyweight

Katsuaki Susa (須佐 勝明, Susa Katsuaki; born September 13, 1984 in Aizuwakamatsu, Fukushima) is a Japanese boxer who competed at the 2012 Summer Olympics in the flyweight division (– 52 kg). He is an alumnus of the Toyo University, and is Second lieutenant in the Japan Ground Self-Defense Force.

Susa took the bronze medal twice in the flyweight division at the Asian Games in 2006 and 2010. In July 2011, he won the gold medal in that division in the 21st President's Cup in Jakarta, Indonesia.

At the 2012 Summer Olympics, Susa competed in the Men's flyweight, but was defeated by the eventual gold medal winner Robeisy Ramírez in the first round.

== See also ==
- 2011 World Amateur Boxing Championships – Flyweight
- 2012 Asian Boxing Olympic Qualification Tournament
