= Sigyel Phub =

Bhutanese boxer (born 1984)

Personal information
- Born: Peljab Sigyel Phub; 1984 (age 41–42) Thimphu, Bhutan
- Height: 5 ft 1 in (1.55 m)
- Weight: Bantamweight; Light welterweight; Welterweight

Boxing career
- Stance: Southpaw
Medal record
South Asian Games
| Silver medal – second place | 2010 Dhaka | Bantamweight |

Sigyel Phub (born 1984) is a Bhutanese former amateur boxer. He competed at the 2013 World Championships as well as two editions of the Asian Games in 2010 and 2014.

== Career ==
Phub, a former soldier, represented the Royal Bhutan Army during his amateur career.

In 2010, Phub won a bantamweight silver medal at the South Asian Games in Dhaka, defeating Sri Lankan representative Kamal Sameera in the semi-finals before losing to Naimatullah of Pakistan in the finals. Later that year he reached the quarterfinals at the Asian Games in Guangzhou despite nursing a hand injury, becoming one of the "main sensations" of the event after his two surprise wins. For his performances, he was nominated for Bhutanese sportsperson of the year by Tshering Tobgay. He also won a bronze medal at the 2011 President's Cup in Indonesia, notably beating future Olympic medallist Satoshi Shimizu in the round of 16. Phub competed in the bantamweight event of the 2013 World Championships in Almaty. In his first bout, he defeated Belarusian opponent Dzmitry Sapon on a 3–0 decision. However, despite being "extremely focused and always operating from a high guard," Phub was defeated in his second match by Veaceslav Gojan. His final major tournament was the 2014 Asian Games in Incheon, where he was upset in his first bout by Nadir Baloch of Pakistan.

After retirement, Phub worked as a coach with the national team. In 2016 he opened Bhutan's first private boxing club, the Druk Thimphu Boxing Club, using Changlimithang Stadium as its training center. Phub drove a taxicab in Thimphu to fund the club's expenses, accomplishing his dream of providing civilians an opportunity to learn the sport. By July of that year, he had 30 members, both male and female, training at his club. In 2018, nine of his boxers were selected to compete at the national championships in Phuntsholing, winning two gold and six silvers medals in the club's debut. It was the first time since the inception of the Bhutan Boxing Federation, over three decades prior, that civilians took part in the competition.

Phub returned to competition at the 2019 national championships in Thimphu, winning the welterweight gold medal. He also competed at the 2019 India Open soon thereafter, moving down to light welterweight for the event.
