= Deepak Maharjan =

Nepalese boxer

Medal record

Men's Boxing

Representing Nepal

Asian Games
Bronze medal – third place	2010 Guangzhou	(81 kg)

Deepak Maharjan (Nepali: दीपक महर्जन) (b: 21 April 1983) is an Asian Games bronze medallist from Bassigaun, Kathmandu Nepal.

== Career ==
- Maharjan won a bronze medal at the Asian Games in Guangzhou, China in the 81 kg category which was Nepal's only medal in the Games.
- Won Male Player of the year of Nepal which is organised by Nepal Sports Journalist forum in 2011.
