= Arshad Hussain (boxer, born 1990) =

Pakistani boxer (born 1990)

Arshad Hussain (Urdu: ارشںد حسیں; born 13 July 1990, in Karachi) is an amateur Pakistani boxer.

== Career ==
Hussain fights in the Welterweight (69 kg) class. He is being supported by Pakistan Air Force.

=== 2010 ===
At the 2010 Asian Games in Guangzhou, he defeated Palestine's Ahmed Altaramsi in the round of 32 when the referee stopped the fight. In the round of 16 he was defeated by Philippines's Wilfredo Lopez.
