= V. Santhosh Kumar =

Indian boxer

Medal record

Representing India

Asian Games
Silver medal – second place	2010 Guangzhou	Light welterweight

Virothu Santhosh Kumar (born 15 November 1991) is an amateur boxer from India. He competes in 61 – 64 kg category. Santhosh won Silver medal in 2010 Asian Games held in Guangzhou, China. He was defeated by Daniyar Yeleussinov of Kazakhstan in the gold medal bout by a score of 16:1.
