= Ilyas Suleimenov =

Kazakhstani boxer (born 1990)

Sport
- Country: Kazakhstan
- Sport: Boxing

Ilyas Suleimenov (born 21 December 1990, Yegindykol, Aqmola) is a Kazakhstani boxer. At the 2012 Summer Olympics, he competed in the Men's flyweight division, but was defeated in the second round by Andrew Selby of Great Britain after defeating Salomo Ntuve of Sweden in the first round.
