= Pak Jong-chol (boxer) =

North Korean boxer

- Hangul: 박정철
- RR: Bak Jeongcheol
- MR: Pak Chŏngch'ŏl

Pak Jong-chol (26 October, 1987, Pyeonyang) is a North Korean boxer. At the 2012 Summer Olympics, he competed in the Men's flyweight, but was defeated in the first round by Julião Henriques Neto.
