= Mohammad Ghossoun =

Syrian boxer (born 1989)

Personal information
- Born: January 28, 1989 (age 37)
Medal record
Men's boxing
Representing Syria
Asian Amateur Boxing Championships
Gold medal – first place	2011 Incheon	Heavyweight
Asian Games
Gold medal – first place	2010 Guangzhou	Heavyweight
Mediterranean Games
Bronze medal – third place	2009 Pescara	Heavyweight

Mohammad Ghossoun (born January 28, 1989) is a Syrian boxer, who competed in the heavyweight division (– 91 kg) at the 2010 Asian Games and won a gold medal.

== Career ==
At the 2009 Mediterranean Games he was defeated in the semi-final by Italy's Clemente Russo and won the bronze medal.

At the 2010 Asian Games, he defeated:

- Vasiliy Levit (Kazakhstan) 11-6
- Jeon Chan-Yeong (South Korea) 10-1
- Ali Mazaheri (Iran) 2-1
- Manpreet Singh (India) 8-1 and won the gold medal

At the 2012 Asian Boxing Olympic Qualification Tournament he lost to old foe Mazaheri 11-14.
