= Israil Madrimov =

Uzbek boxer (born 1995)

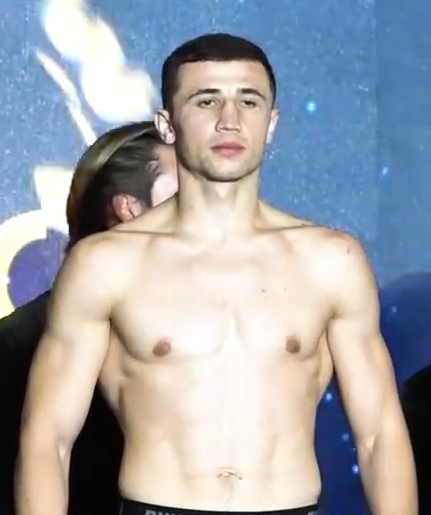
- Madrimov in 2021

Personal information
- Nickname: The Dream
- Born: February 16, 1995 (age 31) Khiva, Khorazm Region, Uzbekistan
- Height: 5 ft 8 1/2 in (174 cm)
- Weight: Light middleweight

Boxing career
- Reach: 68 1/2 in (174 cm)
- Stance: Orthodox

Boxing record
- Total fights: 14
- Wins: 11
- Win by KO: 7
- Losses: 2
- Draws: 1
Medal record
Men's Boxing
Representing Uzbekistan
Asian Games
Silver medal – second place	2014 Incheon	Welterweight
Gold medal – first place	2018 Jakarta	Middleweight
Asian Championships
Gold medal – first place	2017 Tashkent	Middleweight

Israil Madrimov (born February 16, 1995) is an Uzbek professional boxer. He held the World Boxing Association (WBA) light-middleweight title in 2024. As an amateur, he won a silver medal in the welterweight division at the 2014 Asian Games and gold in the middleweight division at the 2018 edition.

== Amateur career ==
At the international level, Madrimov won gold medals at the 2017 Asian Championships and 2018 Asian Games, and silver medals at the 2011 Junior World Championships; 2013 Asian Youth Championships; and 2014 Asian Games. At national level he won the 2013 and 2016 Uzbekistan National Championships, and placed second at the 2014 edition.

=== Highlights ===
AIBA World Championships 2017

- Defeated Azizbek Achilov (Turkey) TKO 3
- Lost to Troy Isley (United States) 2–3

Asian Games 2014

- Defeated Dipesh Lama (Nepal) TKO 2
- Defeated Yasuhiro Suzuki (Japan) TKO 3
- Defeated Apichet Saensit (Thailand) 3–0
- Lost to Daniyar Yeleussinov (Kazakhstan) 0–3

2018

- Defeated Davaasürengiin Davaanyam (Mongolia) 5–0
- Defeated Shahin Mousavi (Iran) 5–0
- Defeated Eumir Marcial (Philippines) 3–2
- Defeated Abilkhan Amankul (Kazakhstan) 3–2

Asian Championships 2017

- Defeated Qasim Abudabaat (Palestine) TKO 1
- Defeated Eumir Marcial (Philippines) 5–0
- Defeated Abilkhan Amankul (Kazakhstan) 5–0
- Defeated Lee Dong-Jin (Korea) 4–1

== Professional career ==
=== Madrimov vs. Hernandez ===
Madrimov made his professional debut on 24 November 2018, against Vladimir Hernandez at the Hard Rock Live in Atlantic City, New Jersey, with the vacant WBA Inter-Continental light-middleweight title on the line. Madrimov dropped his opponent in round three en route to a sixth-round technical knockout (TKO) victory. At the time of the stoppage, Madrimov was ahead on all three judges' scorecards (50–44, 50–43, 49–45). The fight was part of the undercard for Dmitry Bivol's successful world title defence against Jean Pascal.

=== Madrimov vs. Rojas ===
Madrimov made the first defence of his title, again on the undercard of a Dmitry Bivol world title fight – this time against Joe Smith Jr. – on 9 March 2019 against Frank Rojas at the Turning Stone Resort & Casino in Verona, New York. Madrimov dropped his opponent in round two with a left hook. Rojas rose to his feet before the referee's count of ten, only to be knocked unconscious moments later with another powerful left hook, giving Madrimov the win via second-round knockout (KO). Two days before the fight it was announced Madrimov's promoters, World of Boxing, had signed a co-promotional deal with Eddie Hearn's Matchroom Boxing USA.

=== Madrimov vs. Gonzalez ===
Madrimov won via sixth-round technical knockout over Norberto Gonzalez at Madison Square Garden in New York City, New York, USA on 8 June 2019.

=== Madrimov vs. Barrera ===
Madrimov defended his title for a second time against Alejandro Barrera on 5 October 2019 at Madison Square Garden, New York City, on the undercard of the Gennady Golovkin vs. Sergiy Derevyanchenko world title fight. Madrimov retained his title with a fifth-round TKO.

=== Madrimov vs. Walker ===
On 15 August 2020, Madrimov fought Eric Walker in the co-main event on a DAZN-televised card in Tulsa, Oklahoma. Madrimov won the fight by unanimous decision. However, there was controversy, as it appeared that Madrimov had knocked Walker down and out with a legal punch in the ninth round of the fight, but referee Gary Ritter ruled that it was not a knockdown or a knockout, but rather that Madrimov had illegally knocked Walker down with his shoulder. As Walker remained down on the canvas for a minute, telling Ritter that he was dizzy, Ritter implored the fighter to get back up. After a minute, Walker stood up, stumbled into the ropes and then collapsed into the corner. Ritter gave Walker five minutes to recover and then restarted the fight, allowing Walker to take further punishment for 2+ rounds. Hall-of-Fame referee Steve Smoger admonished Ritter after the fight for not ruling a knockdown and subsequent knockout, asserting that Walker took unnecessary punishment as a result.

=== Madrimov vs. Soro ===
On 17 December 2021, Madrimov fought Michel Soro, who was ranked #1 by the WBA at light middleweight, in an eliminator for the WBA light-middleweight championship. Madrimov won by technical knockout in the ninth round.

=== Madrimov vs. Soro II ===
The next bout was a rematch against Soro. A violent clash of heads in the third round cut Soro near the left eye and blood poured on the canvas. After consultation, referee Steve Gray decided to stop the bout and the bout ended in a technical draw.

=== Madrimov vs. Kurbanov ===
On March 8, 2024 in Riyadh, Saudi Arabia, Madrimov faced the undefeated Magomed Kurbanov for the vacant WBA light-middleweight title. He stopped Kurbanov in the fifth round, winning the title.

In Tashkent, Israil Madrimov was awarded by the President of the Republic of Uzbekistan. He was handed the keys to a Chevrolet Tahoe.

=== Madrimov vs. Crawford ===
On April 20, 2024, it was reported that Madrimov would make the first defense of his WBA light-middleweight title against ESPN's #1 P4P fighter Terence Crawford on August 3, 2024, at BMO Stadium in Los Angeles, California, with the vacant interim WBO title also on the line. Crawford, undefeated at 40–0 and a two-time undisputed champion and three-weight world champion, was coming off of a stoppage victory over Errol Spence Jr. to become undisputed at welterweight.

Madrimov proved to be a difficult matchup for Crawford, preventing Crawford from settling into his rhythm and repeatedly catching him with a straight rights, while Crawford found success behind the southpaw jab, landing with hard uppercuts and being more active. Despite a constant back-and-forth, Crawford dominated his way to a unanimous decision victory, handing Madrimov his first loss and ending his brief title reign. Madrimov nevertheless became the first person to go the distance with Crawford since 2016 after an 11-fight stoppage streak, and the competitiveness of the bout even made some observers question Crawford's ability at heavier weights.

=== Madrimov vs. Ortiz ===
Following his loss to Crawford, Madrimov was initially scheduled to next face Serhii Bohachuk on the Oleksandr Usyk vs. Tyson Fury 2 undercard at the Kingdom Arena in Riyadh, Saudi Arabia, on December 21, 2024. However, Madrimov pulled out citing bronchitis and was replaced by Ishmael Davis. Instead, Madrimov's next fight would be against Vergil Ortiz Jr. on the undercard of Beterbiev vs. Bivol 2 on February 22, 2025, this time at The Venue Riyadh Season in Riyadh. This fight would be for Ortiz's WBC interim light-middleweight title.

After 12 rounds, Madrimov lost by unanimous decision, with two scores of 115–113 and one score of 117–111. Madrimov was the second fighter to go the distance with Ortiz, following Bohachuk in his previous fight.

=== Madrimov vs. Salazar ===
After 11 months out of the ring due to knee and shoulder surgeries, Madrimov faced Luis David Salazar on 24 January 2026 at Fontainebleau in Las Vegas, USA. Madrimov had also been recovering from pneumonia prior to the bout. He won by unanimous decision, earning scores of 99–1 from all three judges. Though Madrimov suffered significant swelling over the left eye, he remained undeterred and controlled the bout from start to finish, hurting Salazar in the final round.

== Professional boxing record ==
14 fights	11 wins	2 losses
By knockout	7	0
By decision	4	2
Draws	1	

No.	Result	Record	Opponent	Type	Round, time	Date	Location	Notes
14	Win	11–2–1	Luis David Salazar	UD	10	24 Jan 2026	Fontainebleau, Las Vegas, Nevada, U.S.	
13	Loss	10–2–1	Vergil Ortiz Jr.	UD	12	22 Feb 2025	The Venue Riyadh Season, Riyadh, Saudi Arabia	For WBC interim light-middleweight title.
12	Loss	10–1–1	Terence Crawford	UD	12	3 Aug 2024	BMO Stadium, Los Angeles, California, U.S.	Lost WBA light-middleweight title; For vacant WBO interim light-middleweight title.
11	Win	10–0–1	Magomed Kurbanov	TKO	5 (12), 2:20	8 Mar 2024	Kingdom Arena, Riyadh, Saudi Arabia	Won vacant WBA light-middleweight title
10	Win	9–0–1	Raphael Igbokwe	UD	10	8 Apr 2023	Boeing Center at Tech Port, San Antonio, Texas, U.S.	
9	Draw	8–0–1	Michel Soro	TD	3 (12), 2:20	9 Jul 2022	The O2 Arena, London, England	Fight stopped in round 3 after a clash of heads opened a cut on Soro
8	Win	8–0	Michel Soro	TKO	9 (12), 3:00	17 Dec 2021	Tashkent, Uzbekistan	
7	win	7–0	Emmany Kalombo	UD	10	3 Apr 2021	Humo Arena, Tashkent, Uzbekistan	
6	Win	6–0	Eric Walker	UD	12	15 Aug 2020	Downtown Streets, Tulsa, Oklahoma, U.S.	
5	Win	5–0	Charlie Navarro	TKO	6 (10), 2:24	29 Feb 2020	Ford Center at The Star, Frisco, Texas, U.S.	
4	Win	4–0	Alejandro Barrera	TKO	5 (10), 2:36	5 Oct 2019	Madison Square Garden, New York City, New York, U.S.	Retained WBA Inter-Continental light-middleweight title
3	Win	3–0	Norberto Gonzalez	TKO	6 (10), 0:49	8 Jun 2019	Madison Square Garden, New York City, New York, U.S.	
2	Win	2–0	Frank Rojas	KO	2 (10), 1:58	9 Mar 2019	Turning Stone Resort Casino, Verona, New York, U.S.	Won vacant WBA Inter-Continental light-middleweight title
1	Win	1–0	Vladimir Hernandez	TKO	6 (10), 1:22	24 Nov 2018	Hard Rock Live, Atlantic City, New Jersey U.S.	

== See also ==
- List of world light-middleweight boxing champions

Sporting positions
Regional boxing titles
Vacant Title last held by Kanat Islam	WBA Inter-Continental light-middleweight Champion; March 9, 2019 – 2019; Vacated	Vacant Title next held by Kieron Conway
World boxing titles
Vacant Title last held by Jermell Charlo as Super champion	WBA light-middleweight champion March 8 – August 3, 2024	Succeeded by Terence Crawford
