= Ali Mazaheri =

Iranian boxer

Personal information
- Full name: Ali Mazaheri
- Nickname: iran
- Nationality: Iranian
- Born: March 31, 1982 (age 44) Kermanshah, Iran
- Height: 2 m (6 ft 7 in)
- Weight: 91 kg (201 lb)

Sport
- Sport: Boxing
- Weight class: Heavyweight
- Club: Jahan Foulad Gharb Kermanshah
- Coached by: Parviz Gholami
Medal record
Asian Games
Gold medal – first place	2006 Doha	Heavyweight
Silver medal – second place	2014 Incheon	Heavyweight
Bronze medal – third place	2010 Guangzhou	Heavyweight
Asian Championships
Gold medal – first place	2007 Ulan Bator	Heavyweight
Bronze medal – third place	2004 Puerto Princesa	Heavyweight
Bronze medal – third place	2009 Zhuhai	Heavyweight

Ali Mazaheri (Persian: علی مظاهری; born March 31, 1982, in Kermanshah, Iran) is an amateur boxer from Iran, who competed in the 2006 Asian Games in the Heavyweight (-91 kg) division and won the gold medal in the final bout against Uzbekistan's Jasur Matchanov 25–19. Mazaheri won the gold medal at the 2007 Ulan Bator Asian Amateur Boxing Championships in the Heavyweight (-91 kg) division.

At the Ahmed Öner Cup, the southpaw beat Emad Abdelhalim Ali and Denis Poyatsika.

At the 2007 World Amateur Boxing Championships he was upset early by Milorad Gajovic (Montenegro).

He qualified for the 2008 Summer Olympics in Beijing, where he lost his debut to Russia's Rakhim Chakhkeiv.

At the 2010 Asian Games he lost to Syria's Mohammad Ghossoun.

He won the rematch against Ghossoun to qualify for the 2012 Olympics in London and was the flagbearer for Iran at the opening ceremony. On 1 August 2012, he was controversially disqualified for holding his opponent in a fight he was leading 6–4 on points. He received three warnings in quick succession from German referee Frank Scharmach before being disqualified. Mazaheri, speaking through a translator, declared that he believes the fight was 'fixed'. The International Boxing Association has since suspended Scharmach for his questionable decision during the fight, in particular for giving Mazaheri three warnings in 56 seconds. Talking about the incident AIBA President Wu Ching-Kuo said in a statement: "I deeply regret that we had to take these decisions. However, our main concern has been and will always be the protection of the integrity and fair-play of our competitions. I will take all possible steps to reinforce this."

Olympic Games
Preceded by Homa Hosseini	Flagbearer for Iran; London 2012	Succeeded by Zahra Nemati
