= Kavita Goyat =

Indian boxer (born 1988)

- Born: 15 August 1988 (age 37); Sisar-Kharbala, Haryana, India
- Citizenship: Indian
- Occupation: Boxer Women's 69-75kg
- Height: 172.72 cm (5 ft 8.00 in)

Kavita Goyat
Medal record

Representing India

Asian Games
Bronze medal – third place	2010 Guangzhou	Women's 69-75kg

Asian Indoor Games
Gold medal – first place	2010 Hanoi	Women's 69-75kg

Kavita Goyat (born 15 August 1988) is a female boxer from India. She competes in 69–75 kg weight category. Kavita won the bronze medal at the 2010 Asian Games held in Guangzhou, China. She lost 1:3 to Jinzi Li of China in the semi-finals of the Asian Games in 2010

== Boxing career ==
Kavita Goyat's present coach is Anoop Kumar. She was earlier being coached by Raj Singh.

During her 6th Nations Cup in the Serbian city in 2017, Kavita Goyat got injured during the semi-finals, due to which she had to settle for the third place. Kavita has previously won gold medal at Hanoi Asian Indoor Games, 2009 in 64 kg category along with Mary Kom. Along with this she has won several national titles.

== Championships and other accomplishments ==
Kavita Goyat has won numerous gold, silver, and bronze medals at various championships.

=== Gold medals ===
- Hanoi Asian Indoor Games (2009)
- 11th Senior Women National Boxing Championship (2010)
- 12th Senior Women National Boxing Championship (2011)
- 4th Inter-Zonal Women National Boxing Championship (2012)
- 11th Senior Women Haryana State Boxing Championship (2010)
- 12th Senior Women Haryana State Boxing Championship (2011)
- 14th Senior Women Haryana State Boxing Championship (2015)

=== Silver medals ===
- 9th Senior Women National Boxing Championship (2008)
- Federation Cup Women Boxing Championship (2009)
- 10th Senior Women National Boxing Championship (2009)
- 13th Senior Women National Boxing Championships (2012)
- 16th Senior(Elite) Women National Boxing Championship (2015)

=== Bronze medals ===
- 14th Senior Women Boxing Competition (2013)
- Asian Games (2010)
- N.C Sharma Memorial Federation Cup Women Boxing Championship (2009)

== Personal life ==
She was born in Haryana, to Om Prakash and Smitra Devi. Her hobbies include playing games and studying.
