= Maimaitituersun Qiong =

Chinese boxer (born 1988)

Mehmet Tursun Chong _{(Pinyin: Qióng Mài Màitítúěrsūn)}
Personal information
- Full name: Mehmet Tursun Chong (Chinese: 琼·麦麦提图尔孙)
- Nationality: China
- Born: January 13, 1988 (age 38) Kashgar, Xinjiang
- Height: 1.70 m (5 ft 7 in)
- Weight: 64 kg (141 lb)

Sport
- Sport: Boxing
- Weight class: Light Welterweight
- Club: Chinese Vanguard Sports Association
Medal record
Men's amateur boxing
Representing China
Asian Games
Bronze medal – third place	2010 Guangzhou	Welterweight
Asian Championships
Gold medal – first place	2011 Incheon	Welterweight
Bronze medal – third place	2019 Bangkok	Welterweight

Mehmet Tursun Chong (Uyghur: مەمەتتۇرسۇن چوڭ, romanized: Memet Tursun Chong; Chinese: 琼·麦麦提图尔孙; pinyin: Qióng Màimàitítúěrsūn; born January 13, 1988, in Kashgar, Xinjiang) is a Chinese amateur boxer, who qualified for the 2008 Olympics in his native country at Light welterweight. He lost his opening match to Gennady Kovalev of Russia on a 15-8 decision. Qiong is an ethnic Uyghur.

He qualified for the 2012 Olympics in London at welterweight. He again lost in the first round, to another Russian boxer, Andrey Zamkovoy.
