= Nursähet Pazzyýew =

Turkmenistan boxer

Medal record

Men's amateur boxing

Representing Turkmenistan

Asian Championships
| Bronze medal – third place | 2019 Bangkok | Middleweight |

Summer Youth Olympics
| Bronze medal – third place | 2010 Singapore | Boys' 69 kg |

Nursahat Pazziyev (born 20 October 1992) is a Turkmen boxer. At the 2012 Summer Olympics, he competed in the Men's middleweight, but was defeated in the first round.

Pazziyev won a bronze medal at the 2019 Asian Championships held in Bangkok.
