= Uktamjon Rahmonov =

Uzbekistani boxer (born 1990)

Uktamjon Rahmonov (born August 31, 1990 in Fergana) is an Uzbek amateur boxer who fought at the 2012 Summer Olympics at junior welterweight. He advanced to the quarterfinals in the Olympics but lost to top favorite Cuban Roniel Iglesias

== 2012 Olympics ==
In the round of 32, Rahmonov beat Anderson Rojas 16-10. He beat Yakup Sener 16-8 in the round of 16. He lost in the quarterfinals to Roniel Iglesias 15-21.

== See also ==
- Boxing at the 2012 Summer Olympics – Men's light welterweight
