= Manpreet Singh (boxer) =

Indian boxer

Medal record

Representing India

Asian Games
Silver medal – second place	2010 Guangzhou	Heavyweight

Manpreet Singh (born 3 May 1985) is an amateur boxer from India and a product of Army Sports Institute. He competes in 82 – 91 kg category. Manpreet won silver medal in 2010 Asian Games held in Guangzhou, China. He was defeated by Mohammad Ghossoun of Syria in the gold medal bout by a score of 8:1.
