= Vikas Krishan Yadav =

Indian boxer (born 1992)

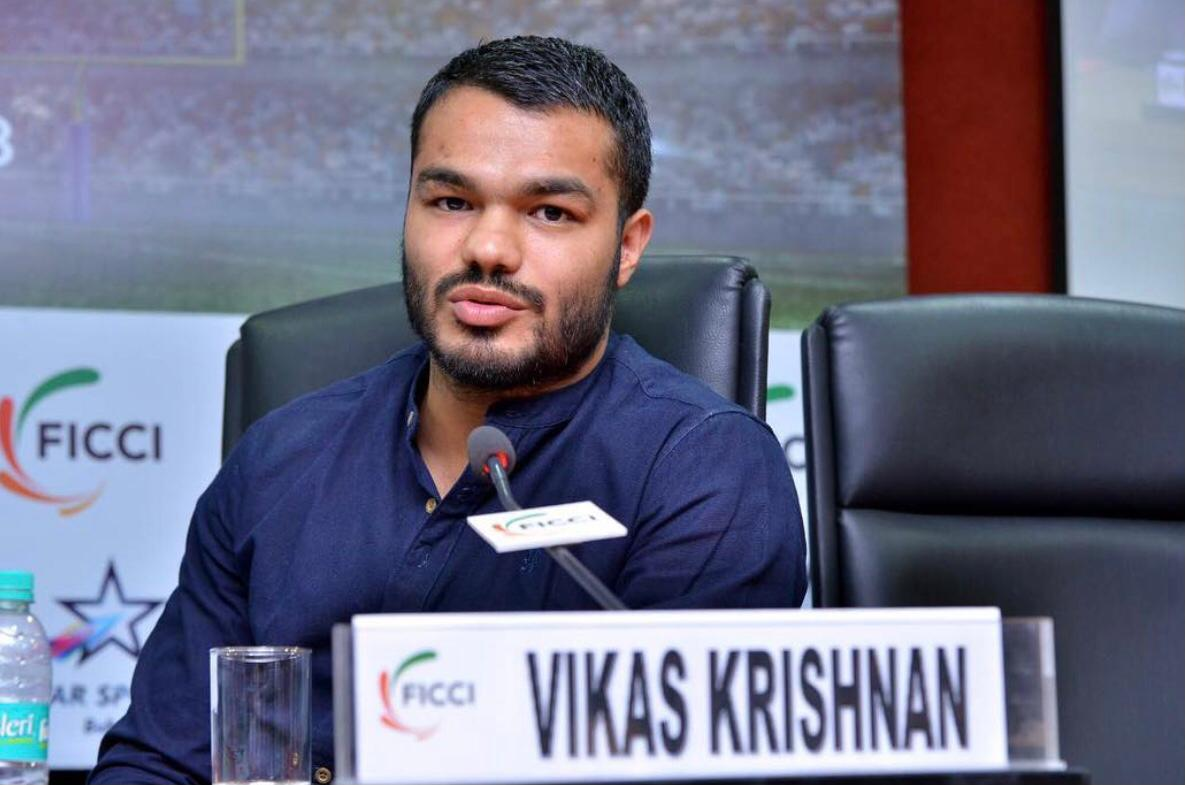
- Vikas Krishan Yadav in 2021

Personal information
- Nationality: Indian
- Born: February 10, 1992 (age 34) Singhwa Khas, Hisar, Haryana, India
- Height: 1.77 m (5 ft 9 1/2 in)
- Weight: 69 kg (152 lb)

Sport
- Sport: Boxing
- Weight class: Welterweight
- Club: Bhiwani Boxing Club
Medal record
Men's amateur boxing
Representing India
Event	1st	2nd	3rd
Olympic Games	-	-	-
World Championships	-	-	1
Asian Games	1	-	2
Commonwealth Games	1	-	-
Youth Olympic Games	-	-	1
Asian Championships	-	1	2
Youth World Boxing Championships	1	-	-
Total	3	1	6
World Championships
Bronze medal – third place	2011 Baku	Welterweight
Asian Games
Gold medal – first place	2010 Guangzhou	Lightweight
Bronze medal – third place	2014 Incheon	Middleweight
Bronze medal – third place	2018 Jakarta Palembang	Middleweight
Asian Championships
Silver medal – second place	2015 Bangkok	Middleweight
Bronze medal – third place	2017 Tashkent	Middleweight
Bronze medal – third place	2021 Dubai	Welterweight
Commonwealth Games
Gold medal – first place	2018 Gold Coast	Middleweight
Summer Youth Olympics
Bronze medal – third place	2010 Singapore	Lightweight
AIBA Youth World Boxing Championships
Gold medal – first place	2010 Baku	Lightweight

Vikas Krishan Yadav (born 10 February 1992) is an Indian boxer from Bhiwani district in Haryana, the hub of some of India's best boxers. He won a gold medal in the 2010 Asian Games in the Lightweight category and a gold medal in 75 kg weight category at the 2018 Commonwealth Games. He is the first Indian male boxer to win gold medals at both the Asian and Commonwealth Games.

Due to the ban on the Boxing Federation of India in 2015, Vikas competed at the World and Asian Championships under the AIBA flag. Vikas Krishan Yadav is the second Indian boxer after Olympian Vijender Singh to qualify for Olympics for the third time.

== Personal life and family ==
Yadav was born in Singhwa Khas village in Hisar district. His father, Krishan Kumar, is an employee in the Electricity Department. In 1994 he came to Bhiwani along with his father, who was transferred to this city by his workplace. In 2003, at the age of 10, Yadav joined the Bhiwani Boxing Club. Later, he received training at the Army Sports Institute Pune.

After his premature exit from the 2012 Olympics, Yadav took a year off from boxing and focussed on completing his education at the Kurukshetra University and his training with the Haryana State Police. Presently, Yadav is an ACP in Haryana Police.

== Career ==
=== 2010 ===
Yadav won a gold medal at the 2010 AIBA Youth World Boxing Championships in Tehran, Iran.

He won a gold medal in 2010 AIBA Youth World Boxing Championships at Baku in the Lightweight category, after defeating Evaldas Petrauskas of Lithuania.

He won a bronze medal in 2010 Summer Youth Olympics in Lightweight category after being defeated by Evaldas Petrauskas of Lithuania in the semifinals.

At the 2010 Asian Games which were held in Guangzhou, China, he won the gold medal after defeating Hu Qing of China 5–4.

=== 2011 World Amateur Boxing Championships ===
At the 2011 World Amateur Boxing Championships, Yadav secured the bronze medal in the welterweight category. He advanced to the semi-finals after defeating Asadullo Boimurodov (16:8), Magomed Nurutdinov (on a tie-break), Önder Şipal (14:7), and Vasile Belous (9:8), before losing 15:12 to Ukraine's Taras Shelestyuk.

=== 2012 Olympics ===
Yadav lost to Errol Spence Jr. of the United States in the last 16. Yadav originally won the bout but Spence successfully appealed his 11–13 loss. Using video review, AIBA determined the bout referee gave too few cautions for holding fouls and should have awarded Spence at least four more points.

=== 2014 Asian Games ===
Representing India at the Games held at Incheon, South Korea, he won the bronze medal in the middleweight (75 kg) category. His first opponent was Azamat Kanybek Uulu of Kyrgyzstan, beating him 3:0 in the Round of 16. His opponent in the quarter-finals was Hurshidbek Normatov of Uzbekistan whom he beat to 3:0 to progress to the semi-finals. In the semi-final bout he lost to Zhanibek Alimkhanuly of Kazakhstan.

=== 2015 Asian Boxing Championships ===
On September 5, 2015, Yadav reached the final of the middleweight category and lost to Bektemir Melikuziev of Uzbekistan, winning the silver medal.

=== 2015 World Amateur Boxing Championships ===
On October 10, 2015, Vikas exited the World Boxing Championships in Doha, Qatar, by losing 3–0 to Hosam Abdin of Egypt in the quarter-finals.

=== 2016 Rio Olympics ===
Yadav qualified for the Rio Olympic Games by finishing with a bronze medal at the Olympic qualifiers held in Baku in June 2016. To win the bronze medal, he beat USA's Charles Cornell by a unanimous decision.

At the Olympics he beat Önder Şipal of Turkey before being defeated by Bektemir Melikuziev of Uzbekistan in the quarterfinal of the men's middleweight (75 kg).

=== 2018 Commonwealth and Asian games ===
Yadav won a gold medal in 2018 Commonwealth Games in Australia defeating boxers from Australia, Zambia, Northern Ireland and Cameroon. He became the first Indian male boxer to win gold medals at both Asian and Commonwealth Games. Yadav beat Cameroon's Dieudonne Wilfried Seyi Ntsengue in the final.

At the 2018 Asian Games, he reached the final had to withdraw from his last match because of a serious eye injury. He was scheduled to face Zeyad Eashash in the final.

On 15 November 2018, Yadav signed a multiyear promotional contract with American-based Top Rank.

=== 2020 Tokyo Olympics ===
Yadav returned to the 69 kg weight class for the 2020 Olympic cycle. By qualifying for the Olympics Games he became only the second Indian male boxer after Olympic bronze medallist Vijender Singh to qualify for a third Olympics. At the Olympic Games, he lost 5–0 to Sewon Okazawa of Japan.

== Awards ==
- Best Boxer, National Championships, New Delhi, 2010
- Arjuna Award, 2012

== Professional boxing record ==
3 fights	3 wins	0 losses
By knockout	1	0
By decision	2	0

No.	Result	Record	Opponent	Type	Round, time	Date	Location	Notes
3	Win	3–0	(Russia) Anatoly Bogomolov	UD	4	4 May 2023	USC Soviet Wings, Moscow, Russia	
2	Win	2–0	(United States) Noah Kidd	UD	6	20 Apr 2019	(United States) Madison Square Garden, New York City, New York, U.S.	
1	Win	1–0	(United States) Steven Andrade	TKO	2 (6), 2:31	18 Jan 2019	(United States) Turning Stone Resort & Casino, Verona, California, U.S.	

== See also ==
- Boxing at the 2010 Asian Games
- Boxing at the 2012 Olympics
- Boxing at the 2014 Asian Games
- Indian boxing
- Middleweight boxing category
