= Jorge Vivas =

Colombian boxer (born 1988)

Personal information
- Born: 22 January 1988 (age 38) Apartadó, Colombia

Sport
- Sport: Boxing
Medal record
Representing Colombia
Men's amateur boxing
Pan American Games
Silver medal – second place	2015 Toronto	Middleweight
South American Games
Gold medal – first place	2018 Cochabamba	Middleweight

Jorge Vivas (born 22 January 1988) is a Colombian boxer. He won a silver medal at the 2015 Pan American Games in the middleweight class. He competed in the men's middleweight event at the 2016 Summer Olympics. In June 2021, he qualified to represent Colombia at the 2020 Summer Olympics.
