= Wessam Salamana =

Syrian boxer

Personal information
- Born: October 26, 1985 (age 39); Al-Mushrifah, Syria
- Height: 1.69 m (5 ft 6 1/2 in)

Sport
- Country: Syria
- Sport: Boxing
- Event: Bantamweight
- Updated on 29 July 2012

Wessam Salamana (Arabic: وسام سلامانا) is a Syrian boxer. He is a two-time Olympic qualifier. At the 2012 Summer Olympics, he was defeated in his first bout in the bantamweight competition by Kazakhstan's Kanat Abutalipov.

Salamana left war-torn Syria for Germany in 2015 with his wife and children. He eventually resumed his boxing training in Voelklingen.

In June 2021, he was awarded qualification for the Tokyo Olympics as a member of the Refugee Olympic Team. He competed in the lightweight division after the elimination of the Olympic men's bantamweight division. Salamana lost his opening bout to Brazil's Wanderson de Oliveira by unanimous decision.
