= Foshan Lingnan Mingzhu Gymnasium =

Sports venue in Foshan, China

- Interactive map of Foshan Lingnan Mingzhu Gymnasium
- Full name: Foshan Lingnan Mingzhu Gymnasium
- Location: Foshan, China
- Coordinates: 23.013383°N 113.123568°E
- Capacity: 8,324

Construction
- Opened: 2006

Tenant
- Foshan Dralions (CBA)

Foshan Lingnan Mingzhu Gymnasium (Chinese: 佛山岭南明珠体育馆) is an indoor sporting arena located in Foshan City, Guangdong Province, China. Opened in 2006, the capacity of the arena is 8,324 spectators. It hosts indoor sporting events such as basketball and volleyball and is the home of the Foshan Dralions who play in the Chinese Basketball Association league. The arena also hosted the boxing events at the 2010 Asian Games.

== See also ==
- List of indoor arenas in China
