= Afghanistan at the 2010 Summer Youth Olympics =

- IOC code: AFG
- NOC: Afghanistan National Olympic Committee

in Singapore
- Competitors: 2 in 2 sports
- Flag bearer: Ahmad Farhad Nawabi

Summer Youth Olympics appearances
- 2010; 2014; 2018

Afghanistan participated in the 2010 Summer Youth Olympics.

== Athletics ==
Note: The athletes who do not have a "Q" next to their Qualification Rank advance to a non-medal ranking final.

=== Boys ===
Track and road events

Event	Athletes	Qualification		Final	
Event	Athletes	Result	Rank	Result	Rank
Boys 100m	Ahmad Farhad Nawabi	12.45	34 qE	12.40	31

== Boxing ==
Athlete	Event	Preliminaries	Semifinals	Final	Rank
Muhammad Oryakhil	Light Welter (64 kg)	Fabián Maidana (ARG); L 2-13	Did not advance	(5th place bout); Lyndell Marcellin (LCA); L 10-12	6
