= Boxing at the 2010 Summer Youth Olympics – Men's 64 kg =

Boxing competitions

These are the results of the Men's Light Welter 64 kg competition in boxing at the 2010 Summer Youth Olympics in Singapore. Preliminaries were held on August 21, semifinals on August 22, 5th place bout on August 23, the bronze medal bout on August 24 and the Final bout on August 25. Unlike world championships and the Olympic Games, only one bronze medal is awarded.

== Medalists ==
Ricardas Kuncaitis
Lithuania
Samuel Zapata
Venezuela
Fabián Maidana
Argentina

== Results ==
Preliminaries
Fabián Maidana (ARG)	13
Muhammad Oryakhil (AFG)	2
Lyndell Marcellin (LCA)	0
Samuel Zapata (VEN)	11

Semifinals
Ricardas Kuncaitis (LTU)	5
Oleg Nekliudov (UKR)	4
Fabián Maidana (ARG)	2
Samuel Zapata (VEN)	4

Final
Ricardas Kuncaitis (LTU)	12
Samuel Zapata (VEN)	6
Third place
Oleg Nekliudov (UKR)
Fabián Maidana (ARG)	WO

5th place bout
Muhammad Oryakhil (AFG)	10
Lyndell Marcellin (LCA)	12
