= 2010 AIBA Youth World Boxing Championships =

Boxing competitions

The 2010 AIBA Youth World Boxing Championships were held in Baku, Azerbaijan, from April 25 to May 3, 2010. It was the second edition of the AIBA Youth World Boxing Championships which had taken over from the Junior World Championship. The competition is under the supervision of the world's governing body for amateur boxing AIBA and is the junior version of the World Amateur Boxing Championships.

A total of 466 boxers from 96 different countries registered to compete in this edition of the competition.

== Medal winners ==
Event	Gold	Silver	Bronze
Light flyweight (–48 kg)	Salman Alizade; Azerbaijan	Ryan Burnett; Ireland	Zohidjon Hoorboyev; Uzbekistan Yosvany Veitía; Cuba
Flyweight (–51 kg)	Shaban Shahpalangov; Azerbaijan	Emmanuel Rodríguez; Puerto Rico	Vasiliy Vetkin; Russia Hesham Abdelaal; Egypt
Bantamweight (–54 kg)	Robeisy Ramírez; Cuba	Shiva Thapa; India	Dawid Michelus; Poland Alexandru Marin; Romania
Featherweight (–57 kg)	Artur Brill; Germany	Norlan Yera; Cuba	Denislav Suslekov; Bulgaria Elvin Isayev; Azerbaijan
Lightweight (–60 kg)	Krishan Vikas; India	Evaldas Petrauskas; Lithuania	Thomas Vahrenholt; Germany Brett Mather; Australia
Light welterweight (–64 kg)	Oleg Neklyudov; Ukraine	Fabián Maidana; Argentina	Samuel Zapata; Venezuela Ričardas Kuncaitis; Lithuania
Welterweight (–69 kg)	David Lourenço; Brazil	Ahmad Mamadjanov; Uzbekistan	Denis Radovan; Germany Islomzhon Dalibaev; Kyrgyzstan
Middleweight (–75 kg)	Joe Ward; Ireland	Damien Hooper; Australia	Juan Carlos Carrillo; Colombia Zoltán Harcsa; Hungary
Light heavyweight (–81 kg)	Irosvani Duvergel; Cuba	Sardorbek Begaliev; Uzbekistan	Anzor Elpiev; Russia Burak Aksın; Turkey
Heavyweight (–91 kg)	Lenier Pero; Cuba	Alexander Ivanov; Russia	Fabio Turchi; Italy Ümit Can Patır; Turkey
Super heavyweight (+ 91 kg)	Filip Hrgović; Croatia	Tony Yoka; France	Joseph Parker; New Zealand Oleksandr Skoryi; Ukraine

== Medal table ==
* Host nation (Azerbaijan)

Rank	Nation	Gold	Silver	Bronze	Total
1	Cuba	3	1	1	5
2	Azerbaijan*	2	0	1	3
3	India	1	1	0	2
3	Ireland	1	1	0	2
5	Germany	1	0	2	3
6	Ukraine	1	0	1	2
7	Brazil	1	0	0	1
7	Croatia	1	0	0	1
9	Uzbekistan	0	2	1	3
10	Russia	0	1	2	3
11	Australia	0	1	1	2
11	Lithuania	0	1	1	2
13	Argentina	0	1	0	1
13	France	0	1	0	1
13	Puerto Rico	0	1	0	1
16	Turkey	0	0	2	2
17	Bulgaria	0	0	1	1
17	Colombia	0	0	1	1
17	Egypt	0	0	1	1
17	Hungary	0	0	1	1
17	Italy	0	0	1	1
17	Kyrgyzstan	0	0	1	1
17	New Zealand	0	0	1	1
17	Poland	0	0	1	1
17	Romania	0	0	1	1
17	Venezuela	0	0	1	1
Totals (26 entries)		11	11	22	44

== See also ==
- World Amateur Boxing Championships
