= Saint Lucia at the 2010 Summer Youth Olympics =

- IOC code: LCA
- NOC: Saint Lucia Olympic Committee

in Singapore
- Competitors: 5 in 4 sports
- Flag bearer: Siona Huxley

Summer Youth Olympics appearances
- 2010; 2014; 2018

Saint Lucia competed at the 2010 Summer Youth Olympics, the inaugural Youth Olympic Games, held in Singapore from 14 August to 26 August 2010.

== Athletics ==
=== Boys ===
Track and road events

Athletes	Event	Qualification		Final	
Athletes	Event	Result	Rank	Result	Rank
Rosen Daniel	Boys' 400m	DNF qD		DNS	

== Boxing ==
Boys

Athlete	Event	Preliminaries	Semifinals	Final	Rank
Lyndell Marcellin	Light Welterweight (64kg)	Samuel Zapata (VEN); L 0-11	Did not advance	5th Place Bout; Muhammad Oryakhil (AFG); W 12-10	5

== Sailing ==
One Person Dinghy

Athlete	Event	Race												Points	Rank
Athlete	Event	1	2	3	4	5	6	7	8	9	10	11	M*	Points	Rank
Stephanie Lovell	Girls' Byte CII	9	23	~~26~~	24	23	20	23	24	~~28~~	10	22	24	202	23

== Swimming ==
Athletes	Event	Heat		Semifinal		Final	
Athletes	Event	Time	Position	Time	Position	Time	Position
Julien Brice	Boys’ 50m Freestyle	24.85	25	Did not advance			
Julien Brice	Boys’ 100m Freestyle	55.01	41	Did not advance			
Siona Huxley	Girls’ 50m Freestyle	28.81	40	Did not advance			
Siona Huxley	Girls’ 50m Backstroke	30.86	12 Q	30.98	13	Did not advance	
