= Boxing at the 2010 South American Games – Men's 64kg =

The Men's 64 kg event at the 2010 South American Games had its quarterfinals held on March 23, the semifinals on March 25 and the final on March 27.

== Medalists ==
Gold	Silver	Bronze
Myke Carvalho; Brazil	Miguel Escandon; Colombia	Gustiniano Mina Caicedo; Ecuador; Angelo Baez Aros; Chile

== Results ==
Quarterfinals
Myke Carvalho (BRA)	8
Fabián Maidana (ARG)	0
Gustiniano Mina Caicedo (ECU)	8
Gabriel Maestre Perez (VEN)	6

Semifinals
Angelo Baez Aros (CHI)
Miguel Escandon (COL)	RSC
Myke Carvalho (BRA)	8
Gustiniano Mina Caicedo (ECU)	6

Final
Miguel Escandon (COL)	4
Myke Carvalho (BRA)	11
