= Michael Farenas =

Filipino boxer (born 1984)

Personal information
- Nickname: Hammer Fist
- Nationality: (Philippines) Filipino
- Born: Michael Farenas; June 10, 1984 (age 42) Gubat, Sorsogon, Philippines
- Height: 5 ft 6 in (1.68 m)
- Weight: Lightweight

Boxing career
- Reach: 68 in (173 cm)
- Stance: Southpaw

Boxing record
- Total fights: 52
- Wins: 42
- Win by KO: 34
- Losses: 5
- Draws: 4
- No contests: 1

Michael Farenas (born June 10, 1984, in Sorsogon, Philippines), is a Filipino professional boxer.

Born in Sorsogon, Farenas currently resides in Redondo Beach, California, California. He is a protégé of former world two division champion Gerry Penalosa.

== Fighting style ==
A hard hitting southpaw, Farenas is known for his aggressive style and his powerful punches.

== Professional career ==
=== Featherweight ===
Farenas made his professional debut on September 19, 2004, against Octavio Olinar at the Sports and Cultural Complex in Mandaue, Philippines. The bout ended in a technical draw after 2 rounds.

On March 15, 2008, Farenas challenged Mexican boxer Baudel Cardenas in the undercard of the Manny Pacquiao-Juan Manuel Marquez big fight at the Mandalay Bay Resort and Casino in Paradise, Nevada. The Filipino prospect won the bout by a third-round technical knockout. After knocking down Cardenas twice in the 2nd round, Farenas landed a vicious low blow in round 3. The Mexican was given five minutes to recover, but he could not continue, forcing the referee to stop the match.

In his next fight, Farenas moved to the super-featherweight division to face Fermin delos Santos. The two fought on May 17, 2008, at the Plaza Monumental in Aguascalientes, Mexico. The Filipino boxer defeated his foe via unanimous decision after 8 rounds. For the fight, the protégé of former WBO bantamweight champion Gerry Peñalosa trained under the guidance of Freddie Roach.

==== First title ====
Farenas won the World Professional Boxing Federation featherweight title on October 3, 2009, by stopping South Korean fighter Jae-Bong Jang in 9 rounds.

On March 13, 2010, Farenas was included in the undercard of the Manny Pacquiao-Joshua Clottey bout. He took on American boxer Joe Morales. The bout ended in a no contest after 2 round, because of an accidental clash of heads that opened a bad cut over Morales' right eye. This forced the ringside doctor to stop the bout.

=== Super Featherweight ===
In his next bout, Farenas challenged Marlon "Rata" Aguilar of Nicaragua in the undercard of the Latin Fury 14 pay-per-view, which showcased the return of Antonio Margarito against Roberto Garcia in Aguascalientes, Mexico. The fight took place on May 8, 2010. Farenas lost by an eight-round unanimous decision and practically blew away his chance at a possible world title bout.

Fareñas had difficulty handling Aguilar who had the edge during infighting sequences. The Filipino boxer tried to be more aggressive in the third but his momentum was hindered when he landed a low blow. In the 6th round, the referee deducted a point from Farenas for low blows and then again in round eight. The latter was falling way behind on points and needed a knockout to win but he didn't seem to have the energy or the inclination to try to get it done. Another low blow from the Filipino fighter interrupted the last round action.

Farenas went on to win 7 straight fights after the Aguilar fight and a draw against Takashi Uchiyama for the WBA title. He then landed an undercard fight on the Pacquiao-Marquez 4 event on December 8, 2012. He fought highly regarded Yuriorkis Gamboa in a 12-round battle for the interim WBA strap. Farenas was knocked down twice but rallied to deliver a knockdown of his own in the 9th round. However, Farenas lost via unanimous decision.

On April 27, 2013, Farenas fought an outmatched Gerardo Zayas whose record was 19–21–2. Farenas dropped Zayas three times in the first round en route to a TKO win against the journeyman.

== Professional Boxing Record ==
42 Wins (34 knockouts), 5 Losses (0 knockouts), 4 Draws, 1 No Contest
Res.	Record	Opponent	Type	Round	Date	Location	Notes
Win	41-5-4; 1 NC	(Mexico) Martin Angel Martinez	KO	3 (10)	2017–6–1	The Hangar, Costa Mesa, United States	
Win	41-5-4; 1 NC	(Thailand) Vachayan Khamon	KO	3 (10)	2015-10-31	Elorde Sports Center, Parañaque, Metro Manila, Philippines	
Win	40-5-4; 1 NC	(Thailand) Boonsom Phothong	TKO	2 (10)	2015-04-25	The Flash Grand Ballroom of the Elorde Sports Complex, Parañaque, Metro Manila, Philippines	
Loss	39-5-4; 1 NC	(Puerto Rico) José Pedraza	UD	12 (12)	2014–11–1	Coliseo Roberto Clemente, San Juan, Puerto Rico	
Win	39-4-4; 1 NC	(United States) Mark Davis	TKO	8 (12)	2014-07-02	Foxwoods Resort, Mashantucket, Connecticut, United States	
Win	38-4-4; 1 NC	(Mexico) Héctor Velázquez	TKO	2 (12)	2014-03-21	San Juan Arena, San Juan, Metro Manila, Philippines	Won WBC Asia Council Continental Super Featherweight title.
Win	37-4-4; 1 NC	(Mexico) Jesus Rios	TKO	2 (10)	2013-12-13	Solaire Resort Hotel and Casino, Pasay, Metro Manila, Philippines	
Win	36-4-4; 1 NC	(Thailand) Kosol Sor Vorapin	KO	2 (10)	2013-10-26	Makati Coliseum, Makati, Metro Manila, Philippines	
Win	35-4-4; 1 NC	(Mexico) Gerardo Zayas	TKO	1 (8)	2013-04-27	Erwin Center, Austin, Texas, United States	
Loss	34-4-4; 1 NC	(Cuba) Yuriorkis Gamboa	UD	12 (12)	2012-12-08	MGM Grand, Grand Garden Arena, Las Vegas, Nevada, United States	For interim WBA World Super Featherweight title.
Draw	34-3-4; 1 NC	(Japan) Takashi Uchiyama	TD	3 (12)	2012-07-16	Winghat, Kasukabe, Saitama, Japan	For WBA World Super Featherweight title. Bout stopped on the 3rd round after an accidental head butt by Farenas.
Win	34-3-3; 1 NC	(Philippines) Jason Mitsuyama	SD	10 (10)	2012-04-21	Mandaue, Philippines	
Win	33-3-3; 1 NC	(Japan) Kenichi Yamaguchi	UD	12 (12)	2011-10-01	Hoops Dome, Lapu-Lapu, Philippines	
Win	32-3-3; 1 NC	(Mexico) Fernando Beltran	SD	8 (8)	2011-07-16	Blaisdell Center, Honolulu, Hawaii, United States	
Win	31-3-3; 1 NC	(Nigeria) Daniel Attah	UD	12 (12)	2011-05-21	Morongo Casino Resort & Spa, Cabazon, California, United States	
Win	30-3-3; 1 NC	(Philippines) Ariel Delgado	MD	10 (10)	2011-01-14	Parañaque, Metro Manila, Philippines	
Win	29-3-3; 1 NC	(Thailand) Sangpetch Patanakan Gym	TKO	1 (10)	2010-10-10	Zamboanga City, Philippines	
Win	28-3-3; 1 NC	(Thailand) Simson Butar Butar	KO	2 (10)	2010-07-23	Mandaluyong, Metro Manila, Philippines	
Loss	27-3-3; 1 NC	(Nicaragua) Marlon Aguilar	UD	8 (8)	2010-05-08	La Feria de San Marcos, Aguascalientes, Mexico	
NC	27-2-3; 1 NC	(United States) Joe Morales	NC	2 (8)	2010-03-13	Cowboys Stadium, Arlington, Texas, United States	
Win	27-2-3	(Thailand) Sathian Somkhao	KO	1 (10)	2010-01-08	Mandaluyong, Metro Manila, Philippines	
Win	26-2-3	(South Korea) Jae-Bong Jang	TKO	9 (12)	2009-10-03	Cuneta Astrodome, Pasay, Metro Manila, Philippines	Won vacant WPBF Featherweight title.
Draw	25-2-3	(Mexico) Arturo Gomez	TD	2 (8)	2007-09-14	Palenque del Recinto Ferial, Nuevo Vallarta, Nayarit, Mexico	Fight stopped due to a cut over Farenas' right eyebrow produced from an accidental headbutt in Round 2.
Win	25-2-2	(Colombia) Walter Estrada	KO	1 (8)	2009-05-01	Hard Rock Hotel and Casino, Las Vegas, Nevada, United States	
Win	24-2-2	(Thailand) Sunan Thosen	KO	3 (10)	2008-12-27	Mandaluyong, Metro Manila, Philippines	
Win	23-2-2	(Thailand) Sorachet Tongmala	KO	1 (10)	2008-10-11	Mandaluyong, Metro Manila, Philippines	
Win	22-2-2	(Thailand) Boonmee Sithsrivinitwitthayakom	KO	6 (10)	2008-07-30	Liloan, Cebu, Philippines	
Win	21-2-2	(Mexico) Fermin De los Santos	UD	8 (8)	2008-05-17	Plaza Monumental, Aguascalientes, Mexico	
Win	20-2-2	(Mexico) Baudel Cardenas	TKO	3 (8)	2008-03-15	Mandalay Bay Resort & Casino, Las Vegas, Nevada, United States	
Win	19-2-2	(Thailand) Kongsurin Sithsoei	KO	5 (10)	2007-12-26	Agoncillo, Batangas, Philippines	
Win	18-2-2	(Mexico) Arturo Valenzuela	TKO	2 (6)	2007-10-06	Mandalay Bay Hotel & Casino, Mandalay Bay Events Center, Las Vegas, Nevada, United States	
Win	17-2-2	(Philippines) Jesar Ancajas	KO	4 (10)	2007-08-04	General Santos, Philippines	
Win	16-2-2	(Philippines) Jeffrey Onate	TKO	2 (8)	2007-04-29	Manila, Metro Manila, Philippines	
Win	15-2-2	(Philippines) Dondon Lapuz	RTD	2 (8)	2007-03-03	Parañaque, Metro Manila, Philippines	
Win	14-2-2	(Japan) Takuro Matsubara	UD	4 (4)	2007-01-13	Korakuen Hall, Tokyo, Japan	
Win	13-2-2	(Philippines) Ronald Postrano	TKO	2 (6)	2006-11-18	Pasay, Metro Manila, Philippines	
Win	12-2-2	(Philippines) Julius Tarona	TKO	7 (8)	2006-09-17	Taguig, Metro Manila, Philippines	
Draw	11-2-2	(Philippines) Roel Mangan	SD	10 (10)	2006-07-22	Binangonan, Rizal, Philippines	
Win	11-2-1	(Philippines) Jerome Arsolon	TKO	5 (8)	2006-06-09	Bacoor, Cavite, Philippines	
Win	10-2-1	(Philippines) Jaime Barcelona	TD	6 (10)	2006-04-21	Manila, Metro Manila, Philippines	
Win	9-2-1	(Philippines) Edwen Gastador	TKO	3 (10)	2006-03-12	Cawayan, Masbate, Philippines	
Loss	8-2-1	(Philippines) Aaron Melgarejo	SD	10 (10)	2006-01-21	Binangonan, Rizal, Philippines	
Win	8-1-1	(Philippines) Roberto Moreno	KO	2 (10)	2005-12-10	Antipolo, Philippines	
Win	7-1-1	(Philippines) Dondon Lapuz	TKO	4 (8)	2005-11-08	Taguig, Metro Manila, Philippines	
Loss	6-1-1	(Philippines) Jun Paderna	UD	10 (10)	2005-08-20	Binangonan, Rizal, Philippines	
Win	6-0-1	(Philippines) Melvin Ayudtud	KO	1 (10)	2005-07-16	San Carlos, Negros Occidental, Philippines	
Win	5-0-1	(Philippines) Greggy Tao on	TKO	2 (8)	2005-05-06	Manila, Metro Manila, Philippines	
Win	4-0-1	(Philippines) Presciano Tabasa	TKO	1 (6)	2005-04-09	Angono, Rizal, Philippines	
Win	3-0-1	(Philippines) Marlon Galicia	TKO	2 (6)	2005-03-05	Taguig, Metro Manila, Philippines	
Win	2-0-1	(Philippines) Ferdinand Sagado	KO	4 (6)	2004-11-27	Parañaque, Metro Manila, Philippines	
Win	1-0-1	(Philippines) Just Bornilla	KO	4 (6)	2004-10-21	Taguig, Metro Manila, Philippines	
Draw	0-0-1	(Philippines) Octavio Aleonar	TD	2 (6)	2004-09-19	Mandaue, Philippines	Pro Debut
