= Alessandro Riguccini =

Italian boxer and kickboxer

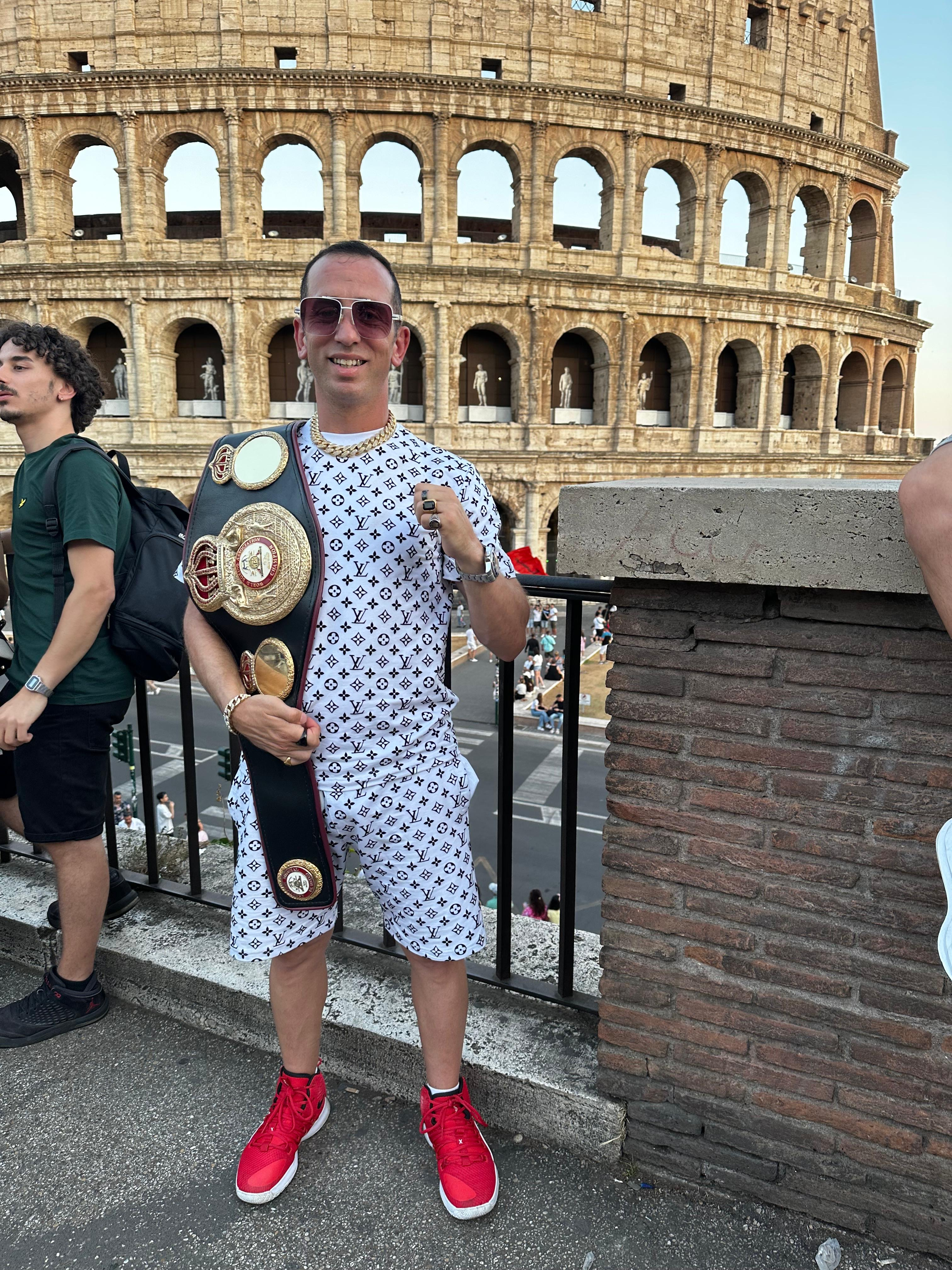
- Born: Alessandro Riguccini; 25 March 1988 (age 38); Florence, Tuscany, Italy
- Other names: "Rognoso"
- Nationality: Italian
- Height: 1.69 m (5 ft 6 1/2 in)
- Weight: 66.7 kg (147 lb; 10.50 st)
- Division: Super featherweight Lightweight; Super lightweight Welterweight; Super-welterweight; Middleweight
- Style: Boxing, Kickboxing, Sanda, Muay Thai, Taekwondo
- Stance: Orthodox
- Fighting out of: Sansepolcro, ITA
- Team: Zanfer Promotions (2012−present); X1 Boxing (2011–2012); Balistic (1999–2010)
- Trainer: Jorge Barrera
- Rank: Black belt in Taekwondo; Black belt in Jiu-Jitsu
- Years active: 1999–present

Professional boxing record
- Total: 32
- Wins: 32
- By knockout: 28

Kickboxing record
- Total: 52
- Wins: 49
- By knockout: 43
- Losses: 3

Amateur Kickboxing record
- Total: 111
- Wins: 96
- By knockout: 54
- Losses: 11
- By knockout: 5
- Draws: 4

Other information
- Occupation: Boxer
- Notable school: Barrera Gym
- Boxing record from BoxRec
- Last updated on: 11 January 2025

Alessandro Riguccini (born 25 March 1988 in Florence, Italy) is an Italian boxer, kickboxer and engineer coached by Mexican trainer Fernando Fernandez.

He is undefeated in professional boxing (32 wins, 28 KOs) and was the WBA interim super-lightweight champion in 2025.

In kickboxing, Riguccini has won multiple titles. He became the Wako Pro middleweight full-contact world champion on 19 November 2010. On 2 July 2011, he also won the Kombat League super welterweight kickboxing world title. Riguccini later won the Wako Pro lightweight title on 24 February 2012. He also held the unified WKA and IKTA super lightweight K1 world titles, winning them on 5 October 2013.

== Amateur kickboxing career ==
Riguccini began kickboxing competitively at the age of 12, with early honours including two Federazione Italiana Wushu-Kung Fu (FIWuK) sanda titles. One of his notable early amateur fights was against Aaram Kuzmenkov of Russia for the CKA sanda amateur world title, where Alessandro lost by a single point. At the end of his amateur career, he reported a record of 96–11–4 out of 111 matches.

=== Training in Cuba ===
By the end of his amateur career, Riguccini moved to Cuba to train in boxing with Olympic gold medalist Héctor Vinent Cháron.

== Professional career ==
=== Kickboxing ===
After returning from Cuba, Riguccini returned to kickboxing and went professional, attaining a record of 39–2 in kickboxing before earning the chance to vie for the world welterweight title in 2010.

==== Riguccini vs Chiahou ====
On 6 March 2010, at Sansepolcro, Italy, Riguccini faced the French champion Ibrahim Chiahou for the Wako Pro welterweight kickboxing world title. Riguccini started well, but by the middle of the match, he found difficulty coping with Chiahou's leg kicks, losing his first world-title bid by decision.

==== Riguccini vs Boumalek ====
On 19 November 2010, Riguccini moved up to the middleweight division to fight Rachid Boumalek at the Palamacchia in Livorno for the Wako Pro full-contact world title. Riguccini delivered a ninth-round knockout to win the world title at the young age of 22.

==== Riguccini vs Ramirez Mendez ====
On 2 July 2011, Riguccini fought Juan Manuel Ramirez in Turin for the Kombat League kickboxing super-welterweight world title. Riguccini scored a second-round KO to win his second world title in kickboxing.

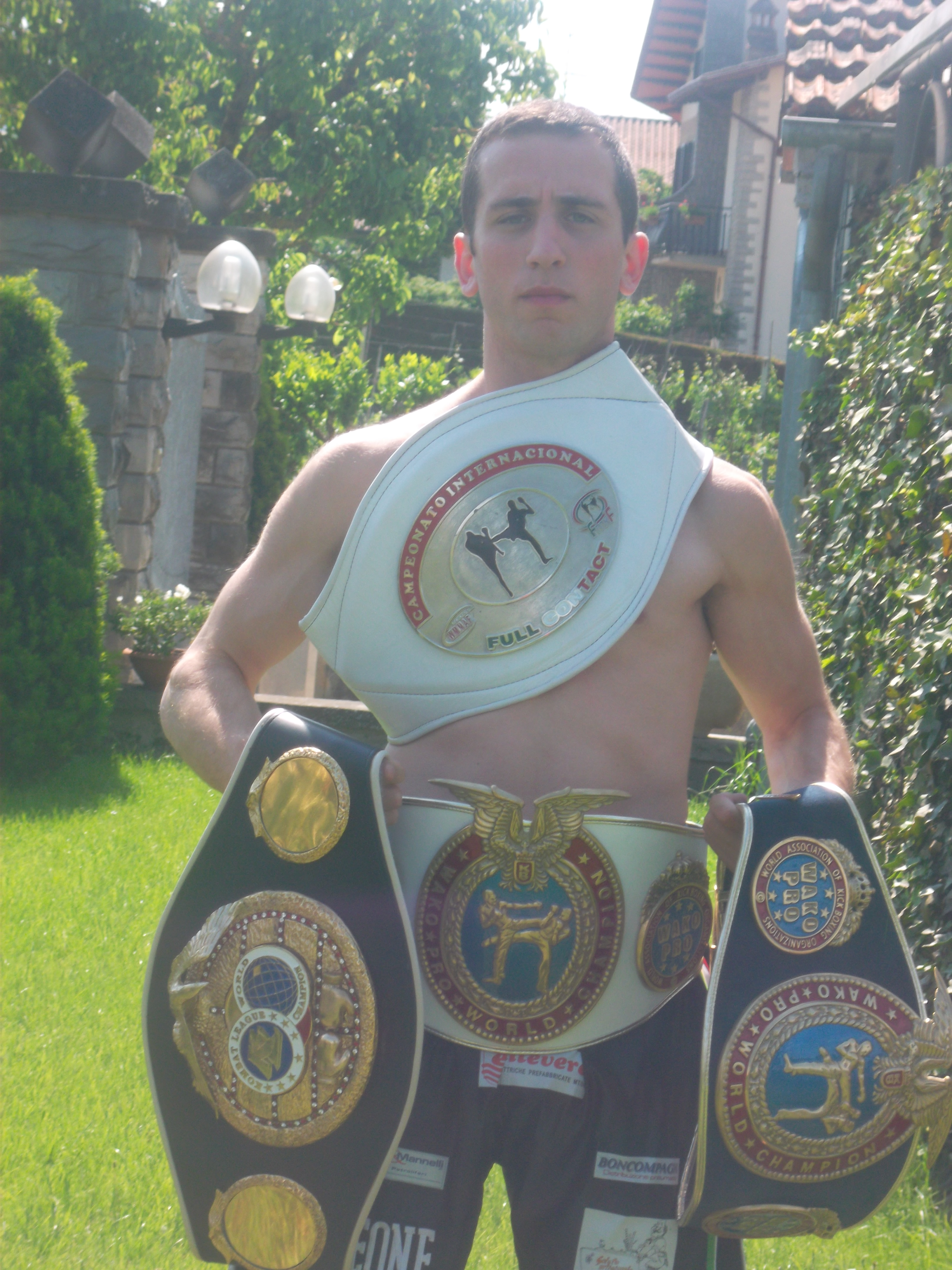
Alessandro Riguccini with his unified kickboxing titles

==== Riguccini vs Gogic ====
Subsequently, on 24 February 2012, Riguccini defeated 2007 WAKO world-championships silver medalist Aleksandar Gogic of Serbia to claim the Wako Pro lightweight world title (–62.200 kg). He won by a five-round unanimous decision.

=== Early boxing career ===
After only 13 amateur fights (7−3–3), Riguccini decided to become a professional boxer under manager Conti Cavini and made his professional debut on 27 January 2012. He won by unanimous decision against Zoltan Janus Horvat.

==== Transfer to Mexico ====
After having terminated his contract with Cavini, Alessandro moved to Mexico on 22 August 2012 to continue his boxing career, establishing himself in Mexico City under Zanfer Promotions where he was coached by Jorge Barrera (brother of Marco Antonio Barrera) at "Barrera Gym", along with others such as Moises Fuentes and Daniel Rosas. On 28 September 2012, he made his Mexican debut by beating Mexican fighter Eduardo Vargas in the second round. Then, on 27 October, he scored a quick first-round knockout against veteran Mexican Leonardo Resendiz, whom he stopped after just 1:57 in what was meant to be his first eight-round bout. Just 18 days after his success against Resendiz, Riguccini scored another KO victory against Gabriel Lopez in the second round; this bout was held at the Ex-Hacienda De Caltengo, Tepeji del Rio, Hidalgo. On 5 December, he again won by second-round KO against the strong Hugo "El Poeta" Pacheco at the Municipal Explanada in Tepeji del Rio. Ten days later, on 15 December, he fought against Orlando "Meteorito" Garcia at the Municipal Auditorium in San Juan Zitlaltepec, winning all four rounds.

==== WBC FECARBOX Title ====
On 28 December 2012, after only six professional matches, Riguccini faced the 26 year-old Eugenio "Dinamita" Lopez in a 12-round match for the WBC FECARBOX title in the super-featherweight division. The fight ended with a fourth-round KO after Alessandro sent Lopez to the mat with a powerful right uppercut.

==== Future career in Mexico ====
On 12 January 2013, Riguccini knocked out Mauricio Becerril at 1:13 of the first round. On 29 January, he got a unanimous decision against the Mexican boxer Tomas Sierra in an 8-round fight at the Auditorio Municipal de Benito Juárez, Tepeji del Rio, Hidalgo. Then, on 9 February, he defeated the Neftali Perez by KO at 1:15 of the first round at the Expo Feria in Hidalgo. On 19 February, he won by disqualification in the eighth round (of the twelve planned) against the young and strong Oscar Arenas, who came in with a record of 23 wins (20 by KO) and only 5 losses, raising Riguccini's profile.

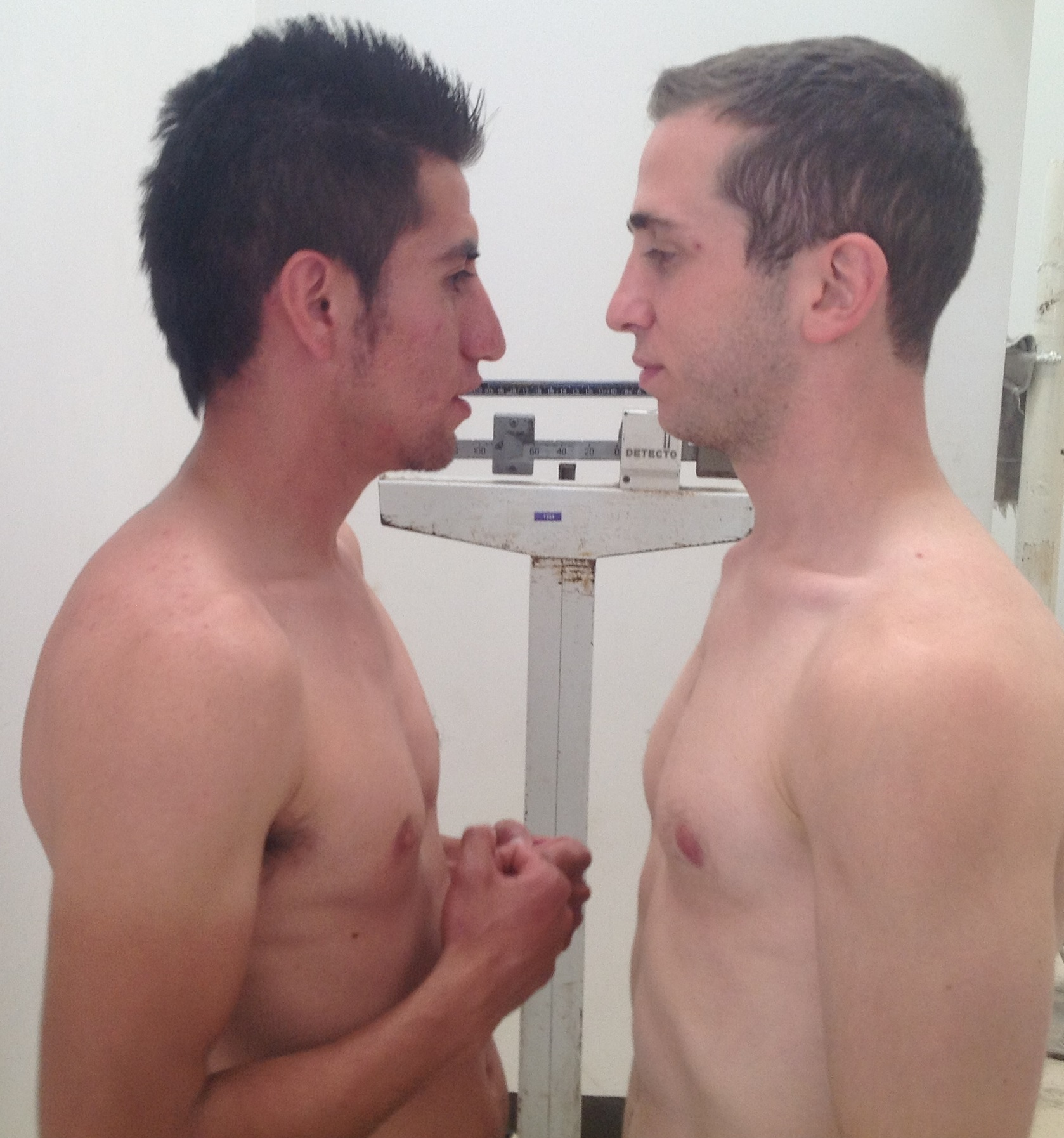
The weigh-in between Alessandro Riguccini and Oscar Arenas

=== Back in Italy and return to Kickboxing ===
After returning to Italy, thanks to his wide experience boxing in Mexico, he decided to try to become a K1-rules world champion. On 5 October 2013, at the "Le Caselle" arena in Arezzo, he scored a first-round KO victory against the Romanian Cosmin "Genghis Khan" Zbranca and won the unified WKA and IKTA K1 super-lightweight world titles.

==== World K1 title defence ====
On 20 December 2014, Riguccini retained his world K1 title against the Swiss Fabrizio Figarù in his hometown of Sansepolcro.

==== Second World K1 title defence ====
On 20 February 2016, Riguccini retained his K1 world title for the second time against the Kazakh Gennady Liviu Petre in San Giovanni Valdarno.

=== Degree and return to professional boxing ===
On 16 June 2016, Riguccini graduated with 110 and honors in computer engineering. Later, on 12 November 2016, he decided to return to Mexico to resume his professional career in boxing, seeking to win world honours. On 10 December 2016, he faced Mario Alberto Mondragon at Guanajuato, winning by knockout at minute 0:19 of the third round after knocking him down for a total of four times throughout the match. On 21 January, he defeated Adrian Reyes by KO at minute 2:42 of the first round, pushing his undefeated record to 13–0. After just two weeks back in the ring in the event "Jackie Nava vs Ana Maria Lozano" organized by Zanfer Promotion beating by KO in the first round (of the six planned) the Mexican Placido Perez Soria. After moving to Guasave (Sinaloa) returns to the ring on 18 March beating by KO effective in the first round (of the ten planned) Hugo Hernandez bringing his record to 15 wins and no losses with 11 KO. Thereafter on 1 April 2017 he beat by KO in the fourth round (of 10 planned) Carlos Lopez reaching the impressive score of 16 victories (of which 12 by KO) and no losses.

==== World Boxing Federation world and IBF International titles ====
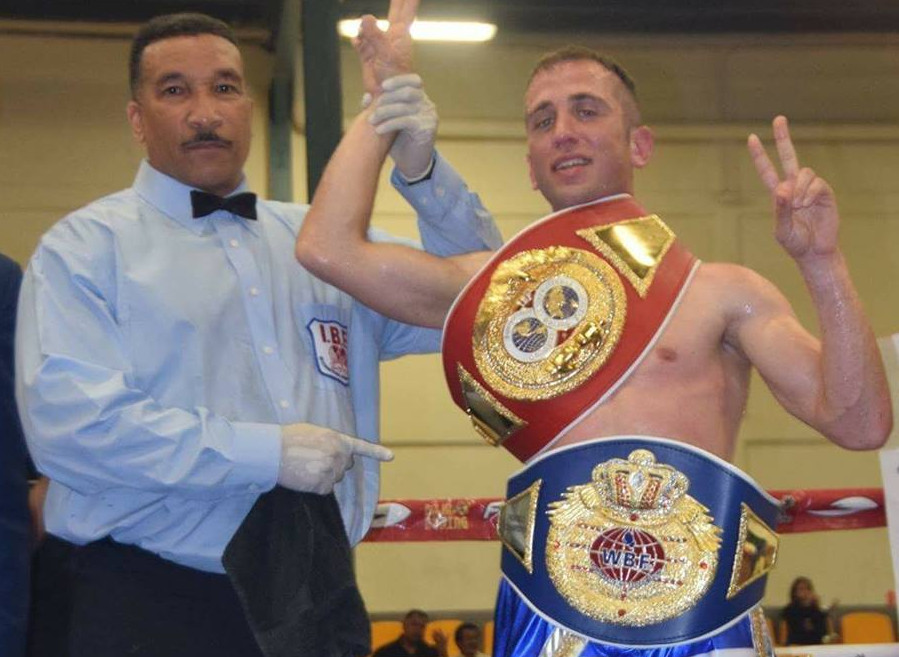
Alessandro Riguccini is proclaimed WBF world and IBF International champion by Tony Weeks

On 22 April 2017, he had the opportunity to also become a boxing champion, albeit for the minor WBF world lightweight title as well as for the IBF International lightweight title. He faced veteran Jesus Antonio Rios, who came to the match with a record of 36 wins (29 KOs), nine defeats, one draw and one no contest. The match began with difficulties for Riguccini, and after two rounds, two judges had it a draw (19-19) and while his opponent was ahead on the third card (18-20). Towards the middle of the third round, he landed a clean right cross on Rios, which he followed up with a series of hard shots that forced referee Tony Weeks to stop the match and deliver the two titles to Riguccini by TKO.

Less than a month away from winning his boxing titles, Riguccini returned to the ring in a 10-round match against the Mexican Jesus Valenzuela at the Guasave Score Bar in Sinaloa, knocking him out in the second round. On 2 June, he returned to the ring in Sinaloa and beat Mexican boxer Christian Valverde by KO in the second round, bringing his record to 19–0 with 15 KOs.

==== Alessandro Riguccini vs Edgar Puerta ====
On 25 November 2017, he took on former two-time WBC Silver champion Edgar Puerta in a 10-round non-title bout, winning by second-round knockout after being knocked down in the first round.

==== Alessandro Riguccini vs Bryan Romero Castillo ====
On 24 March 2018, he defeated the Mexican Bryan Romero Castillo, who entered the bout with a record of 20 wins (15 KOs) and only 1 loss. Riguccini knocked his opponent out at 1 minute and 21 seconds of the first round, thus raising his unbeaten record to 21 wins with 17 KOs.

==== WBC Silver interim welterweight champion ====
On 27 October 2018, he won the WBC Silver interim welterweight title against the undefeated Andrés Villaman (14-0–1, 10KOs), bringing his record to 22 wins (18 KOs) and no defeats.

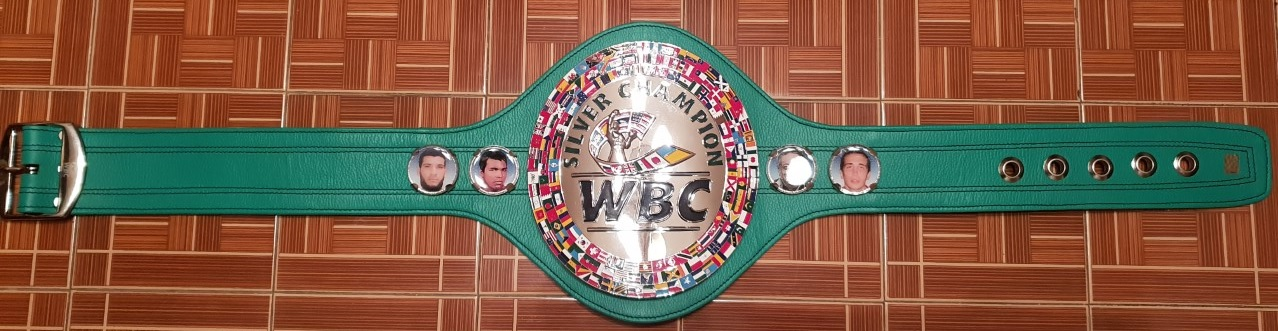
The WBC Silver interim belt won by Alessandro Riguccini

On 26 April 2019, he successfully defended his interim title against the Mexican Iván Álvarez Ruiz at the Tuscany Hall in Florence. He won by TKO in the third round after a severe livershot left his opponent unable to defend.

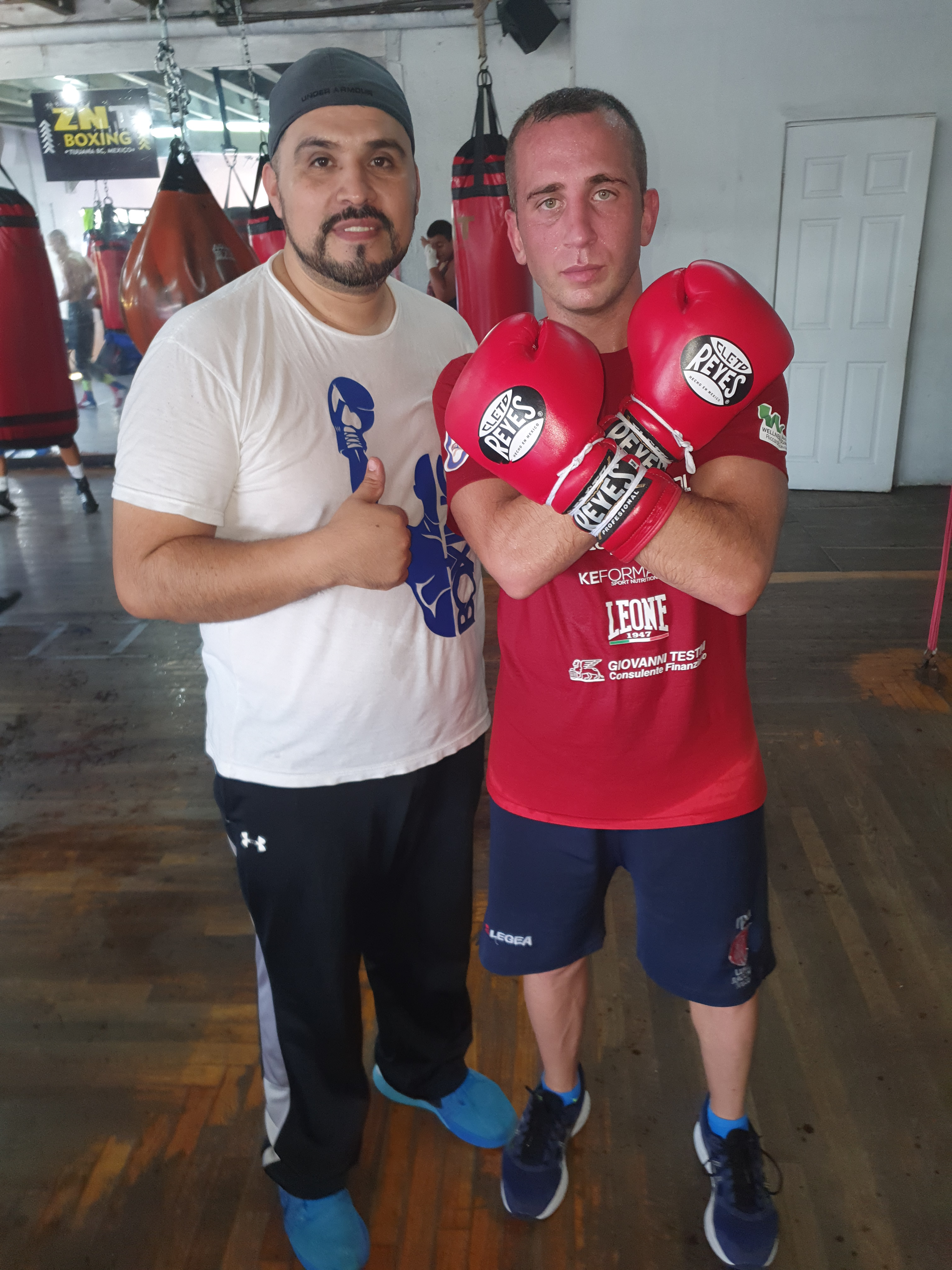
Alessandro Riguccini and his trainer Fernando Fernandez in Tijuana

On 26 October 2019, he made a second successful defence against Venezuelan Juan Ruiz at the Plaza de Toros in Cancún. After a difficult first round, Riguccini managed to land hard shots against Ruiz in the second, continuing to land punishing body blows in the third round, breaking a rib and forcing his opponent to quit on his stool before the fourth round.

On 21 November 2020, after more than a year of inactivity due to the global COVID-19 pandemic, Riguccini climbed back into the ring to face Iván Álvarez Ruiz for the second time, defeating him by KO at the beginning of the third round with a powerful right to the solar plexus.

On 19 March 2021, he successfully defended his WBC Silver interim title for the third time against former WBA interim super-lightweight world champion Johan Perez of Venezuela at the Salon SNTE 53 in Guasave, Sinaloa. The first round was cautious, as Riguccini opted to analyze his opponent. At the start of the second round, he hit his opponent's liver with a strong left hook that forced him to the canvas, winning by KO.

A year later, he went back to the ring against veteran Eleazar Valenzuela Carrillo (a former opponent of illustrious boxers such as Miguel Berchelt, Jose Zepeda and Emanuel Navarrete), winning by KO in the third round via a series of blows to the body. He repeated this manner of victory in 8 February 2023 against Rordani Flores, this time after five hard-fought rounds at the end of which Riguccini won by TKO.

==== WBA Fedecentro super-welterweight title ====
On 18 May 2024, he won the WBA Fedecentro super-welterweight title by beating the Cuban Rordani Flores at 2:39 of the first round with a left hook to the temple. The match took place at the Palacio de los Eventos of the Hotel Maruma in Maracaibo, Venezuela.

==== WBA International super-lightweight title ====
On 15 November 15, 2024, he defeated Mexican fighter Patricio Lopez Moreno in the first round of a scheduled 10-round bout, winning the WBA International super-lightweight title. Lopez entered the fight with a record of 31 wins and 5 losses, having previously faced Olympic silver medalist Shakhram Giyasov and WBO world champion Denys Berinchyk, losing to the latter by unanimous decision. This victory secured Riguccini the 15th position in the WBA super-lightweight rankings.

==== WBA interim super-lightweight world title ====
In July 2025, Alessandro Riguccini fought in Tirana, Albania, in the most important match of his career thus far against the undefeated Venezuelan Jesús Antonio Correa Pinto, for the WBA interim super-lightweight world title. In front of a packed international crowd at the Tirana Olympic Park, Riguccini prevailed with authority, landing a powerful left hook to the liver that ended the fight in the second round. With this victory, he became the WBA interim champion, bringing his record to 31 wins (27 KOs) and 0 losses.

== Professional boxing record ==
32 fights	32 wins	0 losses
By knockout	28	0
By decision	3	0
By disqualification	1	0

No.	Result	Record	Opponent	Type	Round, time	Date	Location	Notes
32	Win	32-0	Eleazar Valenzuela Carrillo	KO	2 (10)	2026-07-03	Ciudad Obregon, Sonora, Mexico	
31	Win	31–0	Jesus Correa	TKO	2 (12)	2025-07-11	Tirana Lake Amphitheatre, Tirana, Albania	Won vacant WBA interim super-lightweight title
30	Win	30–0	Patricio Lopez Moreno	TKO	1 (10)	2024-11-15	Palacio de Eventos de Venezuela, Maracaibo, Venezuela	Won vacant WBA International super-lightweight title
29	Win	29–0	Rordani Flores	KO	1 (10)	2024-05-18	Palacio de Eventos de Venezuela, Maracaibo, Venezuela	Won vacant WBA Fedecentro super-welterweight title
28	Win	28–0	Eleazar Valenzuela Carrillo	TKO	5 (10)	2023-02-08	Guasave, Mexico	
27	Win	27–0	Eleazar Valenzuela Carrillo	KO	3 (10)	2022-03-05	Landeros Gym, Guasave, Mexico	
26	Win	26–0	Johan Pérez	KO	2 (12)	2021-03-19	Salon SNTE 53, Guasave, Mexico	Defended WBC Silver interim welterweight title
25	Win	25–0	Ivan Alvarez	TKO	3 (10)	2020-11-21	Frontón Palacio Jai Alai, Tijuana, Mexico	
24	Win	24–0	Juan Ruiz	RTD	3 (12)	2019-10-26	Plaza de Toros, Cancún, Mexico	Defended WBC Silver interim welterweight title
23	Win	23–0	Ivan Alvarez	KO	1 (12)	2019-04-26	Tuscany Hall, Florence, Italy	Defended WBC Silver interim welterweight title
22	Win	22–0	Andrés Villaman	TKO	3 (12)	2018-10-27	Gimnasio Oscar 'Tigre' García, Ensenada, Mexico	Won vacant WBC Silver interim welterweight title
21	Win	21–0	Bryan Romero Castillo	KO	1 (10)	2018-03-24	Domo Sindicato de Trabajadores IMSS, Tlalpan, Mexico	
20	Win	20–0	Edgar Puerta	KO	2 (10)	2017-11-25	Domo Sindicato de Trabajadores IMSS, Tlalpan, Mexico	
19	Win	19–0	Christian Soto Valverde	TKO	2 (10)	2017-06-02	Salon Eventos Modelo, Guasave, Mexico	
18	Win	18–0	Jesus Valenzuela	TKO	2 (10)	2017-05-20	Score Sport Bar, Guasave, Mexico	
17	Win	17–0	Jesus Antonio Rios	TKO	3 (12)	2017-04-22	Auditorio Ernesto Rufo, Rosarito, Mexico	Won vacant WBF and IBF International lightweight titles
16	Win	16–0	Carlos Lopez Marmolejo	KO	4 (10)	2017-04-01	Cancha Tecate, Sinaloa de Leyva, Mexico	
15	Win	15–0	Hugo Hernández	TKO	1 (10)	2017-03-18	Score Sport Bar, Guasave, Mexico	
14	Win	14–0	Placido Perez	TKO	1 (6)	2017-02-04	Auditorio Pablo Colin, Cuautitlán Izcalli, Mexico	
13	Win	13–0	Adrian Reyes Tostado	KO	1 (8)	2017-01-21	Club Deportivo Tecate de Bachoco, Guasave, Mexico	
12	Win	12–0	Mario Alberto Mondragon	KO	3 (10)	2016-12-10	Coroneo, Mexico	
11	Win	11–0	Oscar Arenas Maya	DQ	8 (12)	2013-02-19	Expo Feria, Tepeji, Mexico	
10	Win	10–0	Neftali Perez	TKO	1 (8)	2013-02-09	Expo Feria, Tepeji, Mexico	
9	Win	9–0	Tomas Sierra	UD	8	2013-01-29	Auditorio Municipal de Benito Juárez, Tepeji, Mexico	
8	Win	8–0	Mauricio Becerril	TKO	1 (6)	2013-01-12	Ex-Hacienda De Caltengo, Tepeji, Mexico	
7	Win	7–0	Eugenio Lopez	KO	4 (12)	2012-12-28	Palenque Recinto Ferial, Atlixco, Mexico	Won vacant WBC FECARBOX super-featherweight title
6	Win	6–0	Orlando Garcia Guerrero	UD	4	2012-12-15	Auditorio Municipal, San Juan Zitlaltepec, Mexico	
5	Win	5–0	Hugo Pacheco	TKO	2 (8)	2012-12-05	Explanada Municipal, Tepeji, Mexico	
4	Win	4–0	Gabriel Lopez	TKO	2 (8)	2012-11-14	Ex-Hacienda De Caltengo, Tepeji, Mexico	
3	Win	3–0	Leonardo Resendiz	TKO	1 (8)	2012-10-27	Auditorio Municipal de Benito Juárez, Tepeji, Mexico	
2	Win	2–0	Eduardo Vargas	TKO	2 (4)	2012-09-28	Arena López Mateos, Tlalnepantla de Baz, Mexico	
1	Win	1–0	Zoltan Horvath	PTS	6	2012-01-27	Palasport Mario D'Agata - Le Caselle, Arezzo, Italy	

== Kickboxing record (incomplete) ==
49 Wins (43 knockouts), 3 Defeat, 0 Draws
Res.	Record	Opponent	Type	Rd., Time	Date	Location	Notes
Win	49-3	(Kazakhstan) Gennady Liviu Petre	KO(Body shot)	2 (5), 1:10	2016-02-20	(Italy) Palazzetto dello Sport, AR, Tuscany	Defended WKA and IKTA K1 Super Lightweight World titles.
Win	48-3	(Russia) Aslan Marabayev	TKO(Body shot)	3 (3), 1:54	2015-09-12	(Italy) Ristorante Big Foods, AR, Tuscany	K1 Prestige Fight
Win	47-3	(Switzerland) Fabrizio Figarù	KO(Body shot)	2 (5), 0:26	2014-12-20	(Italy) Palazzetto dello Sport, AR, Tuscany	Defended WKA and IKTA K1 Super Lightweight World titles.
Win	46-3	(Romania) Cosmin Zbranca	TKO(Body shot)	1 (5), 1:27	2013-10-05	(Italy) Palasport "Le Caselle", AR, Tuscany	Won WKA and IKTA K1 Super Lightweight World titles.
Win	45-3	(Serbia) Aleksandar Gogic	Unanimous decision	5 (5), 3:00	2012-02-24	(Italy) Palazzetto dello Sport, AR, Tuscany	Won Wako Pro Kickboxing Lightweight World title.
Win	44-3	(Albania) Alin Butnariuc	Unanimous decision	3 (3), 3:00	2011-11-19	(Italy) Palasport, TS, Friuli-Venezia Giulia	Trieste Fight Night K1 prestige fight -67kg
Win	43-3	(Uruguay) Juan Manuel Ramirez	TKO(Body shot)	2 (5), 0:21(3:00)	2011-07-02	(Italy) Palasport, Turin, Piedmont	Won Kombat League World Kickboxing Light Middleweight title.
Win	42-3	(Morocco) Rachid Boumalek	KO(Right straight)	9 (12), 1:23(2:00)	2010-11-19	(Italy) Palamacchia, Livorno, Tuscany	Won Wako Pro World Full Contact Middleweight title.
Win	41-3	(Mexico) Marco Ghibaudo	Unanimous decision	7 (7), 2:00	2010-06-18	Palacio Videmar, Mexico City	Won WMMAF International Full Contact Light Middleweight title.
Loss	40-3	(France) Ibrahim Chiahou	Split decision	5 (5), 3:00	2010-03-06	(Italy) Palazzetto dello Sport, AR, Tuscany	Fight was for Wako Pro World Kickboxing Welterweight title.

== Professional Mixed Martial Arts record ==
2 Wins (1 knockout), 0 Defeat, 0 Draws
Res.	Record	Opponent	Type	Rd., Time	Date	Location	Notes
Win	2-0	(Italy) Emanuele Valentini	Submission(Armbar)	2 (3), 0:22(5:00)	2018-06-14	(Italy) Ristorante Green Pub, San Giustino Umbro	−67.0 kg
Win	1-0	(Italy) Daniel Bellistri	TKO(Retired)	1 (3), 3:34(5:00)	2016-06-24	(Italy) Ristorante Green Pub, San Giustino Umbro	−66.5 kg

== Amateur Mixed Martial Arts record ==
1 Win (1 knockout), 0 Defeat, 0 Draws
Res.	Record	Opponent	Type	Rd., Time	Date	Location	Notes
Win	1-0	(France) Andrei Ruelle	TKO(Retired)	1 (3), 3:00	2007-03-06	(Italy) Palazzetto dello Sport, Milan	Italy vs France "Fight 2 Win"−70.0 kg

== Championships and accomplishments ==
=== Professional boxing ===
- WBA interim super-lightweight Champion
- Silver interim welterweight Champion (three title defenses)
- WBA International super-lightweight Champion
- WBA Fedecentro super-welterweight Champion
- IBF International lightweight Champion
- WBC FECARBOX super-featherweight Champion.
- WBF World lightweight Champion

=== Professional Kickboxing ===
- Kickboxing
  - Wako Pro kickboxing World lightweight -62.2 kg Champion
  - Wako Pro full contact World middleweight -71.8 kg champion
  - WKA K1 World super lightweight -63.5 kg champion(2 Title Defences 2014,2016).
  - Kombat League kickboxing World super welterweight -69.9 kg champion
  - IKTA K1 World super lightweight -63.5 kg champion(2 Title Defences)
  - WMMAF full contact International super welterweight -69.9 kg champion
  - Wako Pro kickboxing World welterweight -66.8 kg championship runner up
- Sanda
  - CKA sanda 2006 Italian champion -70 kg
  - CKA sanda 2007 Italian champion -70 kg

=== Amateur Kickboxing ===
- Sanda
  - CKA sanda 2005 super welterweight Italian junior championship (gold) -65 kg
  - FIWuK sanda 2006 super welterweight Italian championship (gold) -70 kg
  - FIWuK sanda 2007 super welterweight Italian championship (gold) -70 kg
  - CKA sanda 2006 super welterweight World championship (silver) -70 kg

== See also ==
- List of male boxers
- List of male kickboxers
- List of male mixed martial artists

Sporting positions
Regional boxing titles
Vacant Title last held by Oliver Flores	WBC FECARBOX super-featherweight champion December 28, 2012 – 2013; Vacated	Vacant Title next held by Adrian Estrella
Vacant Title last held by Tommy Coyle	IBF International lightweight champion April 22, 2017 – 2017; Vacated	Vacant Title next held by Gianluca Ceglia
Inaugural Champion	WBC Silver interim welterweight champion October 27, 2018 – 2021; Vacated	Vacant Title next held by Jose Zepeda
Vacant Title last held by Derrieck Cuevas	WBA Fedecentro light-welterweight champion May 18, 2024 – 2024; Vacated	Vacant
Vacant Title last held by Sandor Martin	WBA International super-lightweight champion November 14, 2024 – 2025; Vacated	Vacant
Minor World boxing titles
Vacant Title last held by Levent Cukur	WBF lightweight champion April 22, 2017 – 2018; Vacated	Vacant Title next held by Xolisani Ndongeni
Interim Major World boxing titles
Vacant Title last held by Ismael Barroso	WBA interim light-welterweight champion Interim title July 11, 2025 – 2025; Vacated	Vacant
