= Pablo César Cano =

Mexican boxer

Personal information
- Nickname: El Demoledor
- Born: Pablo César Cano Garcia; 4 October 1989 (age 37) Tlalnepantla, State of Mexico, Mexico
- Height: 5 ft 7 in (170 cm)
- Weight: Light welterweight; Welterweight

Boxing career
- Reach: 71 in (180 cm)
- Stance: Orthodox

Boxing record
- Total fights: 46
- Wins: 35
- Win by KO: 25
- Losses: 9
- Draws: 1
- No contests: 1

Pablo César Cano García (born 4 October 1989) is a Mexican professional boxer. He held the WBA interim super lightweight title in 2012, and challenged once for the WBC super lightweight title in 2011 and once for the WBA welterweight title in 2012. As of November 2020, he is ranked as the world's ninth best super lightweight by the Transnational Boxing Rankings Board.

== Professional career ==
In June 2010, Pablo beat the veteran Óscar Leon to win the NABF super lightweight title.

=== WBC super lightweight championship ===
On 17 September 2011 Cano faced three-division titleholder Érik Morales for a vacant WBC super lightweight title, on the undercard of Victor Ortiz vs. Floyd Mayweather. Cano lost via technical knockout (TKO) in the tenth round to Erik Morales. He replaced hard-hitting Lucas Matthysse of Argentina, who withdrew with a viral infection that prevented him from training.

He also fought Paulie Malignaggi in what was supposed to be a title fight, however Cano missed weight. Cano dropped Malignaggi in the eleventh round. The fight ended with a disputed split decision in Malignaggi's favor.

Cano also faced Shane Mosley in Cancun, dropping a unanimous decision with all three scorecards being 115–113.

On 13 September 2018, Cano fought Ruslan Madiev. The fight started off fast, with both fighters exchanging a number of punches from the opening round. In the fifth round, Madiev caused a massive cut over Cano's left eye with a headbutt followed by a punch. Huge amounts of blood made the referee stop the fight, which led to a technical decision victory for Cano, who was up 49–47 on all three scorecards at the time.

In his next fight, Pablo Cesar Cano fought former champion Jorge Linares who moved up from lightweight. Cano shocked the boxing world by dominating Linares, dropping him three times in the first round before the judge would see that Linares, despite beating the count could not take any more punishment from Cano. Linares seemed like he could not take any of Cano's punches and seemed oversized by Cano.

After the biggest win of his career, Cano faced Roberto Ortiz on November 16, 2019. Ortiz started off strong and managed to drop Cano in the first round. After the first round ended, it seemed like that was the only time Ortiz had any chance at winning the fight, since from the start of the second round Cano took over the fight. Cano would end up dominating the round and dropping Ortiz twice, before the referee had seen enough and called the fight to a stop.

== Professional boxing record ==
46 fights	35 wins	9 losses
By knockout	25	4
By decision	10	5
Draws	1	
No contests	1	

No.	Result	Record	Opponent	Type	Round, time	Date	Location	Notes
46	Loss	35–9–1 (1)	Shakhram Giyasov	TD	11 (12)	24 Feb 2024	Caribe Royale Orlando, Orlando, Florida, U.S.	
45	Win	35–8–1 (1)	Zachary Ochoa	TKO	6 (10), 1:57	4 Oct 2023	Whitesands Events Center, Plant City, Florida, U.S.	
44	Win	34–8–1 (1)	Oscar Arenas Maya	KO	3 (6), 1:45	29 Oct 2022	Arena Neza, Ciudad Nezahualcoyotl, Mexico	
43	Loss	33–8–1 (1)	Danielito Zorrilla	KO	2 (10), 0:56	14 Sep 2021	Seminole Hard Rock Hotel & Casino Hollywood, Florida, U.S.	
42	Win	33–7–1 (1)	Roberto Ortiz	TKO	2 (10), 1:55	16 Nov 2019	Plaza de Toros, San Miguel de Allende, Mexico	Retained WBC International Silver super lightweight title
41	Win	32–7–1 (1)	Jorge Linares	TKO	1 (12), 2:48	18 Jan 2019	Madison Square Garden Theater, New York City, New York, U.S.	Retained WBC International Silver super lightweight title
40	Win	31–7–1 (1)	Ruslan Madiev	TD	5 (10), 3:00	13 Sep 2018	Hard Rock Hotel and Casino, Paradise, Nevada, U.S.	Won vacant WBC International Silver super lightweight title
39	Loss	30–7–1 (1)	Marcelino Lopez	TKO	2 (10), 1:55	13 Oct 2017	Fantasy Springs Casino, Indio, California	
38	Loss	30–6–1 (1)	Fidel Maldonado	SD	10	17 Jun 2017	Tostitos Championship Plaza, Frisco, Texas, U.S.	
37	Win	30–5–1 (1)	Mauricio Herrera	SD	10	18 Nov 2016	Fantasy Springs Resort Casino, Indio, California, U.S.	
36	Loss	29–5–1 (1)	Alan Sanchez	SD	10	6 May 2016	Toshiba Plaza Paradise, Nevada, U.S.	For vacant WBC Continental Americas welterweight title
35	Win	29–4–1 (1)	Silverio Ortiz	UD	10	19 Dec 2015	Deportivo Tlalli, Tlalnepantla, Mexico	
34	NC	28–4–1 (1)	Juan Carlos Abreu	MD	10	27 Feb 2015	Fantasy Springs Resort Casino, Indio, California, U.S.	Originally MD win for Cano, overturned due to failed drug test
33	Win	28–4–1	Jorge Silva	KO	1 (10), 2:09	7 Feb 2015	Domo del Palacio Municipal, Chetumal, Mexico	
32	Loss	27–4–1	Fernando Angulo	TKO	9 (10), 0:07	1 Mar 2014	World Trade Center Mexiquense, Naucalpan de Juárez, Mexico	
31	Win	27–3–1	Ashley Theophane	SD	10	14 Sep 2013	MGM Grand Garden Arena, Paradise, Nevada, U.S.	
30	Loss	26–3–1	Shane Mosley	UD	12	18 May 2013	Grand Oasis Cancún, Cancún, Mexico	For vacant WBC International welterweight title
29	Loss	26–2–1	Paulie Malignaggi	SD	12	20 Oct 2012	Barclays Center, New York City, New York, U.S.	
28	Win	26–1–1	Johan Pérez	TD	7 (12), 0:55	21 Jul 2012	Grand Oasis Cancún, Cancún, Mexico	Won WBA interim super lightweight title
27	Win	25–1–1	Fidel Monterrosa	KO	9 (10), 1:08	26 May 2012	Grand Oasis Cancún, Cancún, Mexico	
26	Win	24–1–1	Francisco Contreras	RTD	6 (10), 0:01	18 Feb 2012	Grand Oasis Cancún, Cancún, Mexico	
25	Loss	23–1–1	Erik Morales	RTD	10 (12), 3:00	17 Sep 2011	MGM Grand Garden Arena, Paradise, Nevada, U.S.	For vacant WBC super lightweight title
24	Win	23–0–1	Mario Hermosillo	TKO	5 (10)	27 Aug 2011	Centro de Espectáculos de la Feria de León, León, Mexico	
23	Win	22–0–1	Pablo Lugo	TKO	7 (10), 2:06	25 Jun 2011	Domo Del Mar, Ciudad Del Carmen, Mexico	
22	Win	21–0–1	Jorge Romero	TKO	4 (10), 2:09	19 Feb 2011	Auditorio Ernesto Rufo, Rosarito Beach, Mexico	
21	Win	20–0–1	Oscar León	SD	10	25 Jun 2010	Auditorio Plaza Condesa, Mexico City, Mexico	Won vacant WBC-NABF super lightweight title
20	Win	19–0–1	Marcos Valdez	KO	1 (8), 0:49	20 Feb 2010	Auditorio Plaza Condesa, Mexico City, Mexico	
19	Win	18–0–1	Tomas Sierra	KO	1 (8)	12 Dec 2009	Auditorio Miguel Barragán, San Luis Potosí City, Mexico	
18	Win	17–0–1	Fabian Marimon	SD	8	20 Jun 2009	Universidad del Norte, Barranquilla, Colombia	
17	Win	16–0–1	Jorge Luis Lopez	TKO	4 (6), 2:00	25 Apr 2009	Arena Miguel Canto Solis, Cozumel, Mexico	
6	Win	15–0–1	Ernesto Gonzalez	UD	8	21 Feb 2009	Auditorio Benito Juárez, Zapopan, Mexico	
15	Win	14–0–1	Luis Rey Campoa	UD	8	31 Jan 2009	Centro de Espectáculos Promocasa, Mexicali, Mexico	
14	Win	13–0–1	Rodrigo Martinez	TKO	2 (8)	20 Sep 2008	Arena Coliseo, Monterrey, Mexico	
13	Win	12–0–1	Jose Luis Rodriguez	TKO	2 (8)	31 Jul 2008	Roots Magic Club, Mexico City, Mexico	
12	Win	11–0–1	Carlos Mario Sanchez	TKO	2 (4)	31 May 2008	Centro Internacional de Convenciones, Chetumal, Mexico	
11	Win	10–0–1	Mario Rodriguez	KO	3 (6)	26 Apr 2008	Fronton El Gato, San Mateo Atenco, Mexico	
10	Win	9–0–1	Alejandro Espindola	TKO	1 (6)	21 Dec 2007	Metepec, Mexico	
9	Win	8–0–1	Jesus Cruz Bibiano	TKO	2 (4)	2 Aug 2007	Vive Cuervo Salom, Mexico City, Mexico	
8	Win	7–0–1	Israel Almarez	KO	2 (4)	30 Jun 2007	Salon 21, Mexico City, Mexico	
7	Win	6–0–1	Osvaldo Ortiz	TKO	1 (6)	29 Mar 2007	Salon 21, Mexico City, Mexico	
6	Win	5–0–1	Adolfo Cruz	TKO	1 (4)	22 Dec 2006	Rodeo Montana, Zihuatanejo, Mexico	
5	Win	4–0–1	Angel Licea	KO	1 (6)	8 Dec 2006	Auditorio Enrique Batiz, Cuatlitlan Izcali, Mexico	
4	Win	3–0–1	Candelario Torres	UD	4	27 Oct 2006	Auditorio Enrique Batiz, Cuatlitlán Izcali, Mexico	
3	Draw	2–0–1	Israel Ramirez	PTS	4	15 Jun 2006	Salon 21, Mexico City, Mexico	
2	Win	2–0	Gilbert Aguilar	PTS	4	26 Apr 2006	Salon Marbet Plus, Ciudad Nezahualcóyotl, Mexico	
1	Win	1–0	Miguel Angel Merino	KO	1 (4)	7 Mar 2006	Auditorio Enrique Batís, Cuautitlán Izcalli, Mexico	

Sporting positions
Regional boxing titles
Vacant Title last held by Ali Chebah	NABF super lightweight champion June 25, 2010 – 2010; Vacated	Vacant Title next held by Josesito López
World boxing titles
Preceded by Johan Pérez	WBA super lightweight champion Interim title July 21, 2012 – 2012; Vacated	Vacant Title next held by Johan Pérez
