= Johan Pérez =

Venezuelan boxer

Personal information
- Nickname: El Terrible
- Born: Johan Alfredo Pérez Mora; June 10, 1983 (age 43) Caracas, Venezuela
- Height: 5 ft 11 in (180 cm)
- Weight: Light welterweight; Welterweight

Boxing career
- Reach: 70 in (178 cm)
- Stance: Orthodox

Boxing record
- Total fights: 45
- Wins: 27
- Win by KO: 16
- Losses: 15
- Draws: 2
- No contests: 1

Johan Pérez (born 10 June 1983) is a Venezuelan professional boxer. He is a former interim WBA Light welterweight champion.

== Professional career ==
On December 10, 2011, Pérez defeated Fernando Castañeda by fourth round technical knockout for the vacant interim WBA light welterweight title. Then go on to lose it to Pablo César Cano.

He would go on to have a second reign, outpointing the previously undefeated Paul Spadafora by majority decision on November 30, 2013, again for the vacant title. After one successful defence he lost it to Mauricio Herrera.

== Professional boxing record ==
45 fights	27 wins	15 losses
By knockout	16	8
By decision	11	7
Draws	2	
No contests	1	

No.	Result	Record	Opponent	Type	Round, time	Date	Location	Notes
45	Loss	27–15–2 (1)	Anibal Cleto Francisco	KO	4 (8)	2023-12-20	Pabellon de Esgrima, Santo Domingo, Dominican Republic	
44	Loss	27–14–2 (1)	Nahuel Gonzalo Garcia	KO	2 (8)	2023-11-03	Monaco Hotel & Resort, Villa Carlos Paz, Argentina	
43	Loss	27–13–2 (1)	Tomasz Nowicki	KO	5 (6)	2023-05-19	Hala Widowiskowo - Sportowa Złotowianka, Złotów, Poland	
42	Loss	27–12–2 (1)	Ezequiel Gurria	KO	5 (8)	2023-03-04	Pavelló de la Vall d'Hebron, Barcelona, Spain	
41	Loss	27–11–2 (1)	Jonathan Jose Eniz	TKO	2 (10)	2022-07-22	Pabellon Santa Cruz, Santa Cruz de la Sierra, Bolivia	
40	Loss	27–10–2 (1)	Haro Matevosyan	UD	12 (12)	2022-03-11	AGON Sportpark, Charlottenburg, Germany	For IBF Inter-Continental light-middleweight title
39	Win	27–9–2 (1)	Asdrubal Gonzalez	UD	6 (6)	2021-10-16	Gimnasio Cubierto Eduardo Pardo, Carrizal, Venezuela	
38	Loss	26–9–2 (1)	Freddy Kiwitt	UD	8 (8)	2021-09-25	Universum Gym, Hamburg, Germany	
37	Loss	26–8–2 (1)	Alessandro Riguccini	KO	2 (12)	2021-03-19	Salon SNTE 53, Guasave, Sinaloa, Mexico	
36	Win	26–7–2 (1)	Kenin Betancourt	UD	8 (8)	2021-02-08	Gimnasio Pedro Cuggia, Caracas, Venezuela	
35	Win	25–7–2 (1)	Orlando Ysaya	UD	8 (8)	2020-02-22	Centro Recreacional Yesterday, Turmero, Venezuela	
34	Loss	24–7–2 (1)	Dylan Charrat	TKO	2 (8)	2019-11-15	Accor Hotel Arena, Paris, France	
33	Loss	24–6–2 (1)	Custio Clayton	UD	10 (10)	2019-06-29	Scotiabank Convention Centre, Niagara Falls, Ontario, Canada	
32	Win	24–5–2 (1)	Aristides Quintero	UD	10 (10)	2018-05-24	Karibe Convention Center, Pétion-Ville, Haiti	
31	Win	23–5–2 (1)	Jackson Torres	TKO	4 (8)	2018-02-10	Fundacion del Niño, Barcelona, Venezuela	
30	Loss	22–5–2 (1)	Fabián Maidana	UD	10 (10)	2017-11-01	La Macarena, Medellin, Colombia	
29	Loss	22–4–2 (1)	Sadam Ali	UD	10 (10)	2017-07-29	Casino Del Sol, Tucson, Arizona, U.S.	
28	Win	22–3–2 (1)	Esteban Alseco	TKO	1 (8)	2017-03-11	Centro Recreacional Yesterday, Turmero, Venezuela	
27	Win	21–3–2 (1)	Jose Antonio Cervantes	KO	1 (8)	2017-02-11	Centro Recreacional Yesterday, Turmero, Venezuela	
26	Draw	20–3–2 (1)	Pedro Verdu	SD	10 (10)	2016-10-01	Centro Recreacional Yesterday, Turmero, Venezuela	
25	Loss	20–3–1 (1)	Dmitry Mikhaylenko	TKO	8 (12)	2015-08-08	Fantasy Springs Resort Casino, Indio, California, U.S.	Lost NABA welterweight title
24	Win	20–2–1 (1)	Humberto Mauro Gutiérrez	UD	12 (12)	2015-01-16	Polideportivo José María Vargas, La Guaira, Venezuela	Won vacant NABA welterweight title
23	Loss	19–2–1 (1)	Mauricio Herrera	MD	12 (12)	2014-07-12	MGM Grand Garden Arena, Las Vegas, Nevada, U.S.	Lost interim WBA light-welterweight title
22	Win	19–1–1 (1)	Fernando Monte de Oca	RTD	10 (12)	2014-05-10	Polideportivo José María Vargas, La Guaira, Venezuela	Retained interim WBA light-welterweight title
21	Win	18–1–1 (1)	Paul Spadafora	MD	12 (12)	2013-11-30	Mountaineer Casino, Chester, West Virginia, U.S.	Won interim WBA light-welterweight title
20	Win	17–1–1 (1)	Yoshihiro Kamegai	UD	10 (10)	2013-06-08	Home Depot Center, Carson, California, U.S.	
19	Win	16–1–1 (1)	Steve Forbes	MD	10 (10)	2013-01-12	BB&T Center, Sunrise, Florida, U.S.	
18	Loss	15–1–1 (1)	Pablo César Cano	TD	7 (12)	2012-07-21	Oasis Hotel Complex, Cancun, Quintana Roo, Mexico	Lost interim WBA light-welterweight title
17	Win	15–0–1 (1)	Fernando Castañeda	TKO	4 (12)	2011-12-10	Palenque de la Feria, Tepic, Nayarit, Mexico	Won interim WBA light-welterweight title
16	Win	14–0–1 (1)	Kenny Galarza	TKO	4 (9)	2011-10-22	Roberto Durán Arena, Panama City, Panama	Won vacant WBA Fedelatin light-welterweight title
15	Draw	13–0–1 (1)	Alberto Mosquera	MD	10 (10)	2011-06-17	Roberto Durán Arena, Panama City, Panama	
14	Win	13–0 (1)	Noel Gomez	KO	2 (8)	2011-04-15	Palacio Dorado, Panama City, Panama	
13	Win	12–0 (1)	Yader Polanco	TKO	1 (6)	2011-03-04	Pharaoh's Casino, Managua, Nicaragua	
12	Win	11–0 (1)	Gilbert Quiros	KO	1 (8)	2010-12-10	Fight Club, Escazu, Costa Rica	
11	Win	10–0 (1)	Johnny Greaves	PTS	4 (4)	2010-11-13	M.E.N. Arena, Manchester, England, U.K.	
10	Win	9–0 (1)	Jose Miranda	UD	8 (8)	2010-07-31	Arena Panama Al Brown, Colón, Panama	
9	Win	8–0 (1)	Azael Cosio	TKO	2 (9)	2010-03-27	Polideportivo José María Vargas, La Guaira, Venezuela	Won vacant WBA Fedecentro light-welterweight title
8	NC	7–0 (1)	Azael Cosio	NC	3 (9)	2009-11-27	Roberto Durán Arena, Panama City, Panama	For vacant WBA Fedebol light-welterweight title
7	Win	7–0	Yonel Echenique	TKO	3 (6)	2009-08-08	Gimnasio Yuyin Luzcando, Panama City, Panama	
6	Win	6–0	Dunis Linan	UD	8 (8)	2009-02-08	Plaza Caracas El Silencio, Caracas, Venezuela	
5	Win	5–0	Franklin Arroyo	KO	1 (6)	2007-06-16	Gimnasio Mocho Navas, Petare, Venezuela	
4	Win	4–0	Catalino Julio	TKO	1 (4)	2006-05-01	Gimnasio Luis Navarro, Los Teques, Venezuela	
3	Win	3–0	Vicente Seca	KO	1 (6)	2006-03-17	El Velodromo Teo Capriles, Caracas, Venezuela	
2	Win	2–0	Luis José León	TKO	2 (4)	2005-07-31	Estadio del Palmar, San Mateo, Venezuela	
1	Win	1–0	Erwin Romero	KO	3 (4)	2005-03-05	Estadio Municipal, Coro, Venezuela	

Sporting positions
Regional boxing titles
Vacant Title last held by William González	WBA Fedecentro light-welterweight champion March 27, 2010 – 2010; Vacated	Vacant Title next held by Roberto Ortiz
Vacant Title last held by Luis Fernando Uribe	WBA Fedelatin light-welterweight champion October 22, 2011 – December 10, 2011; Won interim title	Vacant Title next held by Khabib Allakhverdiev
Vacant Title last held by Jo Jo Dan	NABA welterweight champion January 16, 2015 – August 8, 2015	Succeeded by Dmitry Mikhaylenko
World boxing titles
Vacant Title last held by Marcos Maidana	WBA light-welterweight champion Interim title December 10, 2011 – July 21, 2012	Succeeded by Pablo César Cano
Vacant Title last held by Pablo César Cano	WBA light-welterweight champion Interim title November 30, 2013 – July 12, 2014	Succeeded by Mauricio Herrera
