= Mauricio Herrera =

American boxer

Personal information
- Nickname: El Maestro ("The Maestro")
- Born: May 24, 1980 (age 46) Riverside, California, U.S.
- Height: 5 ft 7 1/2 in (171 cm)
- Weight: Light welterweight; Welterweight

Boxing career
- Reach: 71 1/2 in (182 cm)
- Stance: Orthodox

Boxing record
- Total fights: 33
- Wins: 24
- Win by KO: 7
- Losses: 9

Mauricio Herrera (born May 24, 1980) is an American professional boxer who held the WBA interim super lightweight title in 2014.

== Professional career ==
Herrera turned pro at age 27, signing with Golden Boy Promotions.

On January 7, 2011 Herrera beat then-undefeated Ruslan Provodnikov on ESPN's Friday Night Fights to win the USBA lightweight title.

On March 15, 2014, Herrera lost a majority decision to Danny García in a 12-round championship bout for the WBC, WBA (Super), and The Ring light welterweight titles, with scores of 116–112 for García twice and 114–114. The decision was controversial with some members of the media scoring the bout in favor of Herrera, including Showtime Championship Boxing's broadcasting team.

On December 13, 2014, Herrera lost a unanimous decision, and his interim WBA light welterweight title, to Jose Benavidez Jr. The HBO commenting team of Max Kellerman, Jim Lampley, and Roy Jones Jr. all agreed that Herrera had won the fight.

Commenting on the losses to Garcia and Benavidez, Herrara said, "A lot of people think I won those fights against Danny Garcia and Jose Benavidez, and after losing to Benavidez, that kind of hurt a little bit and represented the way things have gone with my career. I was almost forgotten, which is frustrating."

In March 2017, Herrera won a unanimous and majority decision over Hector Velazquez, and in August 2017 repeated the effort against Jesus Soto Karass.

On December 15, 2018, Sadam Ali defeated Herrera by unanimous decision on the Canelo Alvarez-Rocky Fielding undercard at Madison Square Garden.

On May 4, 2019, Vergil Ortiz Jr. defeated Herrera in the third round of the co-feature of the Canelo Alvarez-Daniel Jacobs middleweight title unification fight at T-Mobile Arena in Las Vegas. It was a fight that featured boxers with a 17-year age difference.

== Professional boxing record ==
33 fights	24 wins	9 losses
By knockout	7	1
By decision	17	8

No.	Result	Record	Opponent	Type	Round, time	Date	Location	Notes
33	Loss	24–9	Vergil Ortiz Jr.	KO	3 (10), 0:29	May 4, 2019	T-Mobile Arena, Paradise, Nevada, U.S.	
32	Loss	24–8	Sadam Ali	UD	10	Dec 15, 2018	Madison Square Garden, New York City, New York, U.S.	
31	Win	24–7	Jesús Soto Karass	MD	10	Aug 4, 2017	Fantasy Springs Resort Casino, Indio, California, U.S.	
30	Win	23–7	Héctor Velázquez	UD	8	Mar 23, 2017	Fantasy Springs Resort Casino, Indio, California, U.S.	
29	Loss	22–7	Pablo César Cano	SD	10	Nov 18, 2016	Fantasy Springs Resort Casino, Indio, California, U.S.	
28	Loss	22–6	Frankie Gómez	UD	10	May 7, 2016	T-Mobile Arena, Paradise, Nevada, U.S.	
27	Win	22–5	Hank Lundy	TD	5 (10), 2:09	Jul 11, 2015	Memorial Sports Arena, Los Angeles, California, U.S.	Won vacant WBC-NABF light welterweight title; Majority TD after Herrera was cut from accidental head clashes
26	Loss	21–5	José Benavidez	UD	12	Dec 13, 2014	Cosmopolitan of Las Vegas, Paradise, Nevada, U.S.	Lost WBA interim light welterweight title
25	Win	21–4	Johan Pérez	MD	12	Jul 12, 2014	MGM Grand Garden Arena, Paradise, Nevada, U.S.	Won WBA interim light welterweight title
24	Loss	20–4	Danny García	MD	12	Mar 15, 2014	Coliseo Rubén Rodríguez, Bayamón, Puerto Rico	For WBA (Super), WBC, and The Ring light welterweight titles
23	Win	20–3	Miguel Angel Huerta	UD	8	Sep 27, 2013	DoubleTree, Ontario, California, U.S.	
22	Win	19–3	Kim Ji-hoon	UD	10	May 2, 2013	Omega Products International, Corona, California, U.S.	
21	Loss	18–3	Karim Mayfield	UD	10	Oct 27, 2012	Turning Stone Resort Casino, Verona, New York, U.S.	For WBO–NABO welterweight title
20	Loss	18–2	Mike Alvarado	UD	10	Apr 14, 2012	Mandalay Bay Events Center, Paradise, Nevada, U.S.	
19	Win	18–1	Mike Dallas Jr.	MD	10	Jun 24, 2011	Pechanga Resort & Casino, Temecula, California, U.S.	
18	Win	17–1	Cristian Favela	UD	8	Apr 29, 2011	DoubleTree, Ontario, California, U.S.	
17	Win	16–1	Ruslan Provodnikov	UD	12	Jan 7, 2011	Cox Pavilion, Paradise, Nevada, U.S.	Won vacant IBF North American light welterweight title
16	Win	15–1	Hector Alatorre	UD	8	Aug 20, 2010	Omega Products International, Corona, California, U.S.	
15	Win	14–1	Efren Hinojosa	RTD	6 (10), 3:00	Apr 23, 2010	DoubleTree, Ontario, California, U.S.	
14	Loss	13–1	Mike Anchondo	SD	8	Dec 4, 2009	Chumash Casino Resort, Santa Ynez, California, U.S.	
13	Win	13–0	Cleotis Pendarvis	MD	8	Oct 9, 2009	DoubleTree, Ontario, California, U.S.	
12	Win	12–0	Jason Davis	TKO	5 (10), 0:57	Aug 14, 2009	Omega Products International, Corona, California, U.S.	Won WBC–USNBC light welterweight title
11	Win	11–0	Luis Alfredo Lugo	UD	10	Jun 12, 2009	DoubleTree, Ontario, California, U.S.	Won WBC–USNBC welterweight title
10	Win	10–0	William Correa	TKO	5 (8), 2:39	Apr 17, 2009	DoubleTree, Ontario, California, U.S.	
9	Win	9–0	Brian Gordon	RTD	5 (8), 3:00	Feb 27, 2009	DoubleTree, Ontario, California, U.S.	
8	Win	8–0	Pavel Miranda	TKO	8 (8), 1:00	Nov 28, 2008	DoubleTree, Ontario, California, U.S.	
7	Win	7–0	Antonio Sorria	UD	4	Sep 26, 2008	DoubleTree, Ontario, California, U.S.	
6	Win	6–0	Santiago Perez	UD	6	Aug 28, 2008	Omega Products International, Corona, California, U.S.	
5	Win	5–0	Daniel Cervantes	UD	6	Aug 1, 2008	Desert Diamond Casino, Phoenix, Arizona, U.S.	
4	Win	4–0	Alan Velasco	SD	6	May 31, 2008	Harrah's Rincon, Valley Center, California, U.S.	
3	Win	3–0	Jose Rodriguez	RTD	2 (4), 3:00	Feb 22, 2008	DoubleTree, Ontario, California, U.S.	
2	Win	2–0	Elisio Garcia	TKO	3 (4), 1:27	Nov 2, 2007	DoubleTree, Ontario, California, U.S.	
1	Win	1–0	Angel Osuna	UD	4	Aug 24, 2007	Omega Products International, Corona, California, U.S.	

Sporting positions
Regional boxing titles
Vacant Title last held by Joaquin Zamora	WBC–USNBC welterweight champion June 12, 2009 – August 14, 2009; Vacated	Vacant Title next held by Favio Medina
Vacant Title last held by Don Juan Futrell	WBC–USNBC light welterweight champion August 14, 2009 – October 2009; Vacated	Vacant Title next held by Ray Narh
New title	IBF North American light welterweight champion January 7, 2011 – October 2012; Vacated	Vacant Title next held by Steve Claggett
Vacant Title last held by Thomas Dulorme	NABF light welterweight champion July 11, 2015 – May 2016; Vacated	Vacant Title next held by Rashad Ganaway
World boxing titles
Preceded by Johan Pérez	WBA light welterweight champion Interim title July 14, 2014 – December 13, 2014	Succeeded by José Benavidez Jr.
