= Héctor Velázquez (boxer) =

Mexican boxer (born 1975)

Personal information
- Born: 5 March 1975 (age 51) Santiago Ixcuintla, Nayarit, Mexico
- Weight: Featherweight; Super featherweight; Lightweight

Boxing career
- Stance: Orthodox

Boxing record
- Total fights: 92
- Wins: 56
- Win by KO: 38
- Losses: 32
- Draws: 3
- No contests: 1

Hector Velázquez Martínez (born 5 March 1975) is a Mexican former professional boxer who competed from 1993 to 2021.

== Professional career ==
Velázquez began his professional career on 16 December 1993, beating fellow debutant José Guardado. He has fought world champions and contenders such as Kevin Kelley, Israel Vazquez, Raul Perez, Robbie Peden, Guty Espadas Jr., Rocky Juarez, Manny Pacquiao, Elio Rojas, Edwin Valero, Jorge Linares, Mickey Bey, Paul Spadafora, Thomas Dulorme, Michael Farenas, Bobby Pacquiao, and Mario Santiago.

== Professional boxing record ==
91 fights	57 wins	30 losses
By knockout	39	10
By decision	17	20
By disqualification	1	0
Draws	3	
No contests	1	

No.	Result	Record	Opponent	Type	Round, time	Date	Location	Notes
92	Loss	56–32–3 (1)	Evan Anthony Sanchez	UD	6	May 22, 2021	Andador de Miramar, Guaymas, Mexico	
91	Loss	56–31–3 (1)	Marvin Cordova Jr.	TKO	4 (10), 2:45	Jan 18, 2020	Southern Colorado Gaming and Event Center, Pueblo, Colorado, U.S.	
90	Loss	56–30–3 (1)	Marvin Cabrera	TKO	4 (6), 1:27	Oct 13, 2017	Fantasy Springs Resort Casino, Indio, California, U.S.	
89	Loss	56–29–3 (1)	Mauricio Herrera	UD	8	Mar 23, 2017	Fantasy Springs Resort Casino, Indio, California, U.S.	
88	Loss	56–28–3 (1)	Alexis Salazar	UD	6	May 25, 2016	Ray Dolby Ballroom, Hollywood, California, U.S.	
87	Loss	56–27–3 (1)	Keandre Gibson	RTD	6 (8), 3:00	Mar 25, 2016	Fantasy Springs Resort Casino, Indio, California, U.S.	
86	Win	56–26–3 (1)	Alejandro Alonso	RTD	4 (8), 3:00	Aug 20, 2015	Rancho Grande Bar, Tijuana, Mexico	
85	Loss	55–26–3 (1)	Jamel Herring	UD	8	Jun 26, 2015	Little Creek Casino Resort, Shelton, Washington, U.S.	
84	Loss	55–25–3 (1)	Regis Prograis	KO	5 (8), 2:59	Jan 9, 2015	Morongo Casino, Resort & Spa, Cabazon, California, U.S.	
83	Loss	55–24–3 (1)	Robert Manzanarez	UD	10	Dec 13, 2014	Salón Las Palmas, Pesqueria, Mexico	
82	Loss	55–23–3 (1)	Jose Roman	UD	8	Sep 26, 2014	Doubletree Hotel, Ontario, California, U.S.	For WBC–CABOFE lightweight title
81	Loss	55–22–3 (1)	Paul Spadafora	UD	8	Jul 11, 2014	Rivers Casino, Pittsburgh, Pennsylvania, U.S.	
80	Loss	55–21–3 (1)	Michael Farenas	TKO	2 (12), 1:40	Mar 21, 2014	Filoil Flying V Centre, San Juan City, Philippines	For vacant WBC–ABCO Continental super featherweight title
79	Win	55–20–3 (1)	Oscar Arenas	UD	8	Jan 5, 2014	Auditoorio Manicipal Queretaro Andador Ninios Heroes, Tequisquiapan, Mexico	
78	Loss	54–20–3 (1)	Thomas Dulorme	UD	8	Nov 30, 2013	Coliseo Guillermo Angulo, Carolina, Puerto Rico	
77	Win	54–19–3 (1)	Eduardo Gomez	TKO	6 (10)	Oct 18, 2013	Auditoorio Manicipal Queretaro Andador Ninios Heroes, Tequisquiapan, Mexico	
76	Loss	53–19–3 (1)	Óscar González	UD	10	Oct 5, 2013	Hipódromo Caliente, Tijuana, Mexico	
75	Win	53–18–3 (1)	Cesar Lopez	KO	2 (8)	Aug 10, 2013	Papas & Beer, Rosarito, Mexico	
74	Loss	52–18–3 (1)	Jorge Linares	UD	10	Oct 6, 2012	Memorial Auditorium, Sacramento, California, U.S.	
73	Win	52–17–3 (1)	Adan Gamboa	UD	4	Jun 7, 2012	Salon Las Pulgas, Tijuana, Mexico	
72	Loss	51–17–3 (1)	Mickey Bey	UD	8	Nov 19, 2011	Reliant Arena, Houston, Texas, U.S.	
71	Draw	51–16–3 (1)	Luis Arceo	MD	10	Sep 10, 2011	Plaza de Toros, Zacatecas, Mexico	
70	Loss	51–16–2 (1)	Mahonri Montes	UD	10	Jun 25, 2011	Estadio Banorte, Culiacán, Mexico	
69	Loss	51–15–2 (1)	Vitali Tajbert	TD	9 (12), 1:35	May 22, 2010	StadtHalle, Rostock, Germany	For WBC super featherweight title; Unanimous TD: Tajbert cut from an accidental head clash
68	Loss	51–14–2 (1)	Edwin Valero	RTD	7 (12), 3:00	Dec 19, 2009	Polideportivo José María Vargas, La Guaira, Venezuela	For WBC lightweight title
67	Loss	51–13–2 (1)	Joksan Hernandez	MD	12	Jun 20, 2009	Gimnasio Oscar 'Tigre' García, Ensenada, Mexico	For vacant WBC Continental Americas super featherweight title
66	Win	51–12–2 (1)	Hector Javier Marquez	SD	8	Mar 7, 2009	Gimnasio INDEJ, Tepic, Mexico	
65	Loss	50–12–2 (1)	Elio Rojas	UD	12	Sep 13, 2008	Beau Rivage Resort & Casino, Biloxi, Mississippi, U.S.	
64	Win	50–11–2 (1)	Manuel Arellano	TKO	2	Jun 14, 2008	Estadio de Beisbol Arturo C. Nahl, La Paz, Mexico	
63	Win	49–11–2 (1)	Trini Rodriguez	TKO	3 (10), 2:52	May 17, 2008	Plaza de Toros Monumental, Aguascalientes, Mexico	
62	Win	48–11–2 (1)	Mario Santiago	TD	10 (12), 2:30	Jul 28, 2007	Emerald Queen Casino, Tacoma, Washington, U.S.	Unanimous TD: Velázquez cut from an accidental head clash
61	Win	47–11–2 (1)	Genaro Garcia	KO	1 (4), 0:54	May 19, 2007	Auditorio Benito Juarez, Guadalajara, Mexico	
60	Win	46–11–2 (1)	Bobby Pacquiao	DQ	11 (12), 2:56	Nov 16, 2006	Hard Rock Hotel and Casino, Paradise, Nevada, U.S.	Won WBC Continental Americas super featherweight title; Pacquiao disqualified for repeated low blows
59	Win	45–11–2 (1)	Yuriy Voronin	UD	12	Sep 1, 2006	Route 66 Casino, Albuquerque, New Mexico, U.S.	
58	Win	44–11–2 (1)	Guadalupe Lupillo Hernandez	UD	10	Jun 17, 2006	Auditorio Municipal, Tijuana, Mexico	
57	Win	43–11–2 (1)	Adan Amador	TKO	2 (8), 2:23	May 20, 2006	Palenque del Hipódromo de Agua Caliente, Tijuana, Mexico	
56	Loss	42–11–2 (1)	Manny Pacquiao	TKO	6 (12), 2:59	Sep 10, 2005	Staples Center, Los Angeles, California, U.S.	For vacant WBC International super featherweight title
55	Win	42–10–2 (1)	Trinidad Mendoza	TKO	5 (10), 1:25	Jul 15, 2005	Aragon Ballroom, Chicago, Illinois, U.S.	
54	Win	41–10–2 (1)	Guadalupe Lupillo Hernandez	TKO	6 (10)	May 16, 2005	El Foro, Tijuana, Mexico	
53	Win	40–10–2 (1)	Marcos Licona	TD	6 (10), 3:00	Feb 11, 2005	Convention Center, San Diego, California, U.S.	

Sporting positions
Regional boxing titles
Vacant Title last held by Gamaliel Díaz	WBC FECARBOX featherweight champion August 23, 2004 – October 2004; Vacated	Vacant Title next held by Gamaliel Díaz
Preceded by Bobby Pacquiao	WBC Continental Americas super featherweight champion November 16, 2006 – March 2007; Vacated	Vacant Title next held by Manuel Pérez
Minor world boxing titles
Vacant Title last held by Orlando Canizales	IBA featherweight champion March 25, 2000 – December 2000; Vacated	Vacant Title next held by John Michael Johnson
