= Fabián Maidana =

Argentine boxer (born 1992)

Personal information
- Nickname: TNT
- Born: Fabián Andrés Maidana; 22 June 1992 (age 34) Margarita, Santa Fe, Argentina
- Height: 5 ft 9 in (175 cm)
- Weight: Super welterweight

Boxing career
- Reach: 72 in (183 cm)
- Stance: Orthodox

Boxing record
- Total fights: 28
- Wins: 24
- Win by KO: 18
- Losses: 4
Medal record
Youth World Championships
Silver medal – second place	2010 Baku	Light welterweight
Summer Youth Olympics
Bronze medal – third place	2010 Singapore	Light welterweight
Panamerican Youth Championships
Bronze medal – third place	2010 Santiago	Light welterweight

Fabián Andrés Maidana (born 22 June 1992) is an Argentine professional boxer. As an amateur, he won a silver medal at the 2010 Youth World Championships and a bronze at the 2010 Summer Youth Olympics.

He is the younger brother of former two-division world champion Marcos Maidana.

== Early years ==
Maidana was born on 22 June 1992 in Margarita, Santa Fe, and from a young age aimed to follow in his brother's footsteps as a boxer. He began training at his cousin's gym when he was 14.

Competing as a light welterweight throughout his amateur career, Maidana enjoyed his most successful year in 2010 and he was named amateur boxer of the year by the Argentina Boxing Federation for his accomplishments. In February he won a bronze medal at the Panamerican Youth Championships. He suffered a quick exit at the South American Games the following month, but followed that up with a silver medal performance at the Youth World Championships in Azerbaijan, where he won five straight bouts before losing to Oleg Neklyudov of Ukraine in the final. Finally, he took home a bronze medal at the 2010 Summer Youth Olympics in Singapore during the summer.

In 2011, Maidana qualified for the Pan American Games through its qualification tournament process. In the first tournament held in Venezuela, he was quickly eliminated by Valentino Knowles in his very first match. However, he won a gold medal at the second tournament a month later to qualify. At the Games in Guadalajara, Maidana was eliminated by eventual silver medalist Valentino Knowles in his first bout. After three rounds the fight finished as a draw, but the win was given to Knowles on a tie-breaker because he landed more punches.

=== Amateur results ===
- 2010 Panamerican Youth Championships in Santiago, Dominican Republic (light welterweight)
  - Defeated Raúl Sánchez (Dominican Republic) 5–4
  - Lost to Prichard Colón (Puerto Rico) 4–10 (bronze)
- 2010 South American Games in Medellín, Colombia (light welterweight)
  - Lost to Myke Carvalho (Brazil) 0–8
- 2010 Youth World Championships in Baku, Azerbaijan (light welterweight)
  - Defeated Victor Kuwornu (Ghana) 9–0
  - Defeated Tamerlan Abdullayev (Azerbaijan) 7–4
  - Defeated Rustam Adzinayev (Belarus) 6–5
  - Defeated Zurab Mekerishvili (Georgia) 4–0
  - Defeated Ričardas Kuncaitis (Lithuania) 3–0
  - Lost to Oleg Neklyudov (Ukraine) 2–6 (silver)
- 2010 Summer Youth Olympics in Singapore (light welterweight)
  - Defeated Muhammad Oryakhil (Afghanistan) 13–2
  - Lost to Samuel Zapata (Venezuela) 2–4
  - Defeated Oleg Neklyudov (Ukraine) WO (bronze)
- 2011 Pan American Games Qualifier 1 in Cumaná, Venezuela (light welterweight)
  - Lost to Valentino Knowles (Bahamas) 7–12
- 2011 Pan American Games Qualifier 2 in Quito, Ecuador (light welterweight)
  - Defeated Joelvis Hernández (Venezuela) 10–2
  - Defeated César Rivas (Panamá) 24–7
  - Defeated Anderson Rojas (Ecuador) 26–16
  - Defeated Antonio Ortiz (Puerto Rico) 20–13 (gold)
- 2011 Pan American Games in Guadalajara, Mexico (light welterweight)
  - Lost to Valentino Knowles (Bahamas) 17–17+

== Professional career ==
Maidana moved to Oxnard, California to train with Robert Garcia, Marcos' former trainer, on the advice of Sebastián Contursi, Marcos' former manager. Maidana made his professional debut on 21 June 2014, defeating Eddie Diaz by unanimous decision on the undercard of the Vasyl Lomachenko–Gary Russell Jr. title fight at the StubHub Center. In his next two fights, he scored a first-round knockout against Philip Soriano on the Shawn Porter–Kell Brook card and a first-round technical knockout against Jared Teer on the Mayweather–Maidana II card. After eight straight wins in the United States, Maidana competed in Argentina for the first time, defeating Andrés Amarilla by unanimous decision in Necochea on 9 April 2016. He moved to 10–0 with a victory over Puerto Rican prospect Jorge Maysonet Jr., who failed to answer the bell for the seventh round.

On 26 November 2016, in just his second fight on home soil, Maidana captured the WBA Fedebol super welterweight title with a second-round TKO of Cristian Romero. After two more wins he faced former world champion Johan Pérez in Medellín, scoring a unanimous decision victory after 10 rounds. In 2018 he secured stoppage wins against Justin Savi at Barclays Center and Andrey Klimov at Staples Center. Ryan Songalia of The Ring wrote that, although he didn't possess the punching power of his older brother, he had "quicker hands and snappier combinations." His 16-fight win streak came to an end on 12 January 2019, when he lost a unanimous decision to Venezuelan veteran Jaider Parra. After a quick knockout of Mexican journeyman Ramsés Agatón that September, he was sidelined for the entire 2020 calendar year due to the COVID-19 pandemic.

Maidana made his return to the ring on 9 April 2021 in Buenos Aires, defeating Carlos Córdoba by unanimous decision.

== Professional boxing record ==
28 fights	24 wins	4 losses
By knockout	18	0
By decision	6	4

No.	Result	Record	Opponent	Type	Round, time	Date	Location	Notes
28	Loss	24–4	(Dominican Republic) Rohan Polanco	UD	10	4 May 2025	(United States) T-Mobile Arena, Paradise, Nevada, U.S.	For vacant WBO Inter Continental welterweight title
27	Win	24–3	(Argentina) Jesús Antonio Rubio	UD	10	4 May 2025	(Argentina) Club Atlético Colón, Santa Fe	Won vacant WBC Latino welterweight title
26	Win	23–3	(Mexico) Francisco Mercado	KO	2 (10)	4 May 2025	Estadio F.A.B., Buenos Aires, Argentina	Won vacant WBA Fedelatin welterweight title
25	Loss	22–3	(United States) Mario Barrios	UD	12	4 May 2024	(United States) T-Mobile Arena, Paradise, Nevada, U.S.	For WBC Interim welterweight title
24	Win	22–2	(Nicaragua) Israel López	UD	10	29 Nov 2023	Estadio Luna Park, Buenos Aires, Argentina	Retained WBC Latino welterweight title
23	Win	21–2	(Nicaragua) Helach Rodríguez	TKO	2 (10), 1:33	16 Sep 2023	Estadio F.A.B., Buenos Aires, Argentina	Retained WBC Latino welterweight title
22	Win	20–2	(Ecuador) Edwin Bennett	KO	3 (10), 2:56	10 Mar 2023	Estadio Luna Park, Buenos Aires, Argentina	Won vacant WBC Latino welterweight title
21	Win	19–2	(Argentina) Carlos Aquino	KO	3 (8)	23 Dec 2022	Club Sarmiento, Resistencia, Argentina	
20	Loss	18–2	(Mexico) Francisco Mercado	UD	7 (8)	17 Dec 2021	San Juan de los Lagos, Jalisco, Mexico	An error by the referee stopped the bout, so it went to scorecards
19	Win	18–1	(Argentina) Carlos Córdoba	UD	10	9 Apr 2021	Estadio Mary Terán de Weiss, Buenos Aires, Argentina	
18	Win	17–1	(Mexico) Ramses Agaton	KO	1 (8), 2:07	28 Sep 2019	(United States) Staples Center, Los Angeles, California, U.S.	
17	Loss	16–1	(Venezuela) Jaider Parra	UD	10	12 Jan 2019	Estadio Polideportivo, Mar del Plata, Argentina	
16	Win	16–0	(Russia) Andrey Klimov	KO	7 (10), 2:32	28 Jul 2018	(United States) Staples Center, Los Angeles, California U.S.	
15	Win	15–0	(Benin) Justin Savi	RTD	3 (6), 3:00	21 Apr 2018	(United States) Barclays Center, New York City, New York, U.S.	
14	Win	14–0	(Venezuela) Johan Pérez	UD	10	1 Nov 2017	La Macarena, Medellín, Colombia	
13	Win	13–0	(Venezuela) Pedro Verdú	TKO	4 (10), 1:20	17 Jun 2017	Microestadio Municipal, Hurlingham, Argentina	
12	Win	12–0	(Argentina) Elías Vallejos	TKO	2 (10)	17 Mar 2017	Club Social y Deportivo El Porvenir, Quilmes, Argentina	
11	Win	11–0	(Argentina) Cristian Romero	TKO	2 (10), 1:29	26 Nov 2016	Estadio Polideportivo Presidente Perón, González Catán, Argentina	Won vacant WBA Fedebol super welterweight title
10	Win	10–0	(Puerto Rico) Jorge Maysonet Jr.	RTD	6 (8), 3:00	23 Jul 2016	(United States) Scottish Rite Theatre, San Antonio, Texas, U.S.	
9	Win	9–0	(Argentina) Andrés Amarilla	UD	8	9 Apr 2016	Club Atlético Rivadavia, Necochea, Argentina	
8	Win	8–0	(Kenya) Peter Oluoch	UD	8	2 Aug 2015	(United States) Full Sail University, Winter Park, Florida, U.S.	
7	Win	7–0	(United States) David Nelson	TKO	1 (5), 1:19	6 Jun 2015	(United States) StubHub Center, Carson, California, U.S.	
6	Win	6–0	(United States) Cory Vom Baur	TKO	2 (6), 2:28	18 Apr 2015	(United States) StubHub Center, Carson, California, U.S.	
5	Win	5–0	(United States) Omar Avelar	TKO	2 (4), 0:57	20 Dec 2014	(United States) Little Creek Casino Resort, Shelton, Washington, U.S.	
4	Win	4–0	(United States) Charon Spain	KO	1 (4), 1:07	20 Nov 2014	(United States) Sportsmen's Lodge, Los Angeles, California, U.S.	
3	Win	3–0	(United States) Jared Teer	TKO	1 (4), 2:07	13 Sep 2014	(United States) MGM Grand Garden Arena, Paradise, Nevada, U.S.	
2	Win	2–0	(United States) Philip Soriano	KO	1 (4), 2:05	16 Aug 2014	(United States) StubHub Center, Carson, California, U.S.	
1	Win	1–0	(United States) Eddie Diaz	UD	4	21 Jun 2014	(United States) StubHub Center, Carson, California, U.S.	
