= Paul Spadafora =

American boxer

Personal information
- Nickname: The Pittsburgh Kid
- Nationality: American
- Born: Paul Ross Spadafora; September 5, 1975 (age 51) Pittsburgh, Pennsylvania, U.S.
- Height: 5 ft 9 in (175 cm)
- Weight: Lightweight; Light welterweight

Boxing career
- Reach: 69 in (175 cm)
- Stance: Southpaw

Boxing record
- Total fights: 51
- Wins: 49
- Win by KO: 19
- Losses: 1
- Draws: 1

Paul Ross Spadafora (born September 5, 1975) is an American retired professional boxer. He is the former IBF lightweight champion of the world, and has challenged once for a light welterweight world title. In 2020, he was inducted into the Pennsylvania Boxing Hall of Fame. A Southpaw with slick defense, quickness, and ability to fight in the pocket and in range, his talent was well-regarded.

== Personal background ==
Known as "The Pittsburgh Kid", Spadafora is from McKees Rocks, a borough outside of Pittsburgh, Pennsylvania. His childhood was poverty-stricken: his father died of a drug overdose when he was nine, and he was homeless for several weeks as a teenager. He started boxing when he was eleven, and left school in 9th grade to focus on it.

By age 16, Spadafora had won multiple Golden Gloves titles while competing in football and basketball at Sto-Rox High School. Encouraged to focus on boxing, he left school to pursue the sport full-time. In December 1994, he suffered a gunshot wound to his left leg when a police officer’s weapon accidentally discharged following a car crash, an injury that ended his hopes of qualifying for the 1996 U.S. Olympic boxing team.

== Professional Career ==
After recovering from the gunshot wound, Spadafora made his professional debut on October 18, 1995, defeating Steve Maddux by unanimous decision. He won his first 15 professional bouts, including eight by knockout, before longtime trainer and mentor P.K. Pecora died of a stroke in 1997. Continuing under trainer Tom Yankello, Spadafora captured the vacant IBF lightweight title on August 20, 1999, defeating Israel Cardona by unanimous decision.

Later that year, he gained attention for an unofficial sparring session with Floyd Mayweather Jr. in Las Vegas, which members of Spadafora’s camp have long maintained Spadafora got the better of. The sparring session has remained a notable part of his boxing legacy and is frequently cited by fans and media.

Spadafora defended his title eight times in a span of nearly four years.

== Troubles outside the ring ==
Spadafora was an alcoholic from a young age and at one point also abused drugs. He pleaded guilty to aggravated assault for shooting his girlfriend Nadine Russo in the chest in October 2003 after a night of drinking, and in February 2005 was sentenced to six months in a bootcamp-style rehabilitation center. He had by then become engaged to Russo, and she had borne his second child. He ultimately went to prison for the crime.

In September and October 2011, Spadafora was twice arrested on DUI charges. The following September he pleaded guilty.

On September 23, 2012, his manager filed suit against him in Allegheny County court for breach of contract.

== Comeback ==
Despite his troubles outside the ring, Spadafora repeatedly expressed his intention to return to the ring. In November 2006 he returned after a 32-month layoff to stop Jesus Francisco Zepeda in round five at the Avalon Hotel in Erie, Pennsylvania.

On April 25, 2008, again in Erie, Spadafora returned to the ring to fight Shad Howard. Spadafora repeatedly connected with sharp jabs and combinations en route to an 80–72 unanimous decision.

In 2010 he defeated Italian boxer Ivan Fiorletta by knockout. In August 2012 he defeated Humberto Toledo.

On April 6, 2013, Spadafora defeated Robert Franckel for the NABF Super Lightweight Championship.

Spadafora suffered the only loss of his career on November 30, 2013, losing to Johan Pérez by majority decision to lose the WBA Light Welterweight title.

== Retirement ==
Paul Spadafora retired from boxing following his 2014 fight with Héctor Velázquez.

In April 2016, Spadafora was charged with assault for an altercation with a woman outside of Redstone Tavern in Crafton, Pennsylvania, and was sentenced to anger management classes.

In December 2016, Spadafora was arrested after police responded to an altercation where Spadafora was accused of attacking his brother with a knife, stabbing him in the thigh, and kicking his mother in the back. In March 2018, Spadafora plead guilty to simple assault, resisting arrest, and terroristic threats, and was sentenced to time served and released on parole.

In November 2023, Spadafora’s official biography, Fighting Till the End, by Chris Scarnati, was published. The book remained on Amazon’s best-seller list for several months. A documentary based on the biography is currently in development.

As of 2024, Paul Spadafora is living in Las Vegas and training boxers in a gym built in his garage. In October 2024, Spadafora was hospitalized after being bitten by his pet dog, severing an artery in his left arm.

== Professional boxing record ==
| 51 fights | 49 wins | 1 loss |
|---|---|---|
| By knockout | 19 | 0 |
| By decision | 30 | 1 |
| Draws | 1 | |

| No. | Result | Record | Opponent | Type | Round, time | Date | Location | Notes |
|---|---|---|---|---|---|---|---|---|
| 51 | Win | 49–1–1 | Héctor Velázquez | UD | 8 | Jul 11, 2014 | Rivers Casino, Pittsburgh, Pennsylvania, US | |
| 50 | Loss | 48–1–1 | Johan Pérez | MD | 12 | Nov 30, 2013 | Mountaineer Casino, Chester, West Virginia, US | For WBA interim super lightweight title |
| 49 | Win | 48–0–1 | Robert Franckel | UD | 10 | Apr 6, 2013 | Mountaineer Casino, Chester, West Virginia, US | Won vacant NABF super lightweight title |
| 48 | Win | 47–0–1 | Solomon Egberime | UD | 10 | Dec 1, 2012 | Mountaineer Casino, Chester, West Virginia, US | |
| 47 | Win | 46–0–1 | Humberto Toledo | UD | 8 | Aug 18, 2012 | Mountaineer Casino, Chester, West Virginia, US | |
| 46 | Win | 45–0–1 | Alain Hernandez | RTD | 5 (10), 3:00 | Nov 20, 2010 | Mohegan Sun Casino, Uncasville, Connecticut, US | |
| 45 | Win | 44–0–1 | Ivan Fiorletta | TKO | 8 (10), 0:40 | Mar 12, 2010 | War Memorial Auditorium, Fort Lauderdale, Florida, US | |
| 44 | Win | 43–0–1 | Jermaine White | UD | 8 | Sep 30, 2009 | Heinz Field VIP Tent, Pittsburgh, Pennsylvania, US | |
| 43 | Win | 42–0–1 | Ivan Orlando Bustos | TKO | 6 (8), 2:26 | Jun 24, 2009 | I.C. Light Amphitheater, Pittsburgh, Pennsylvania, US | |
| 42 | Win | 41–0–1 | Shad Howard | UD | 8 | Apr 25, 2008 | Avalon Hotel, Erie, Pennsylvania, US | |
| 41 | Win | 40–0–1 | Oisin Fagan | SD | 10 | Mar 9, 2007 | Soaring Eagle Casino, Mount Pleasant, Michigan, US | |
| 40 | Win | 39–0–1 | Frankie Zepeda | TKO | 5 (10), 2:07 | Nov 22, 2006 | Avalon Hotel, Erie, Pennsylvania, US | |
| 39 | Win | 38–0–1 | Francisco Campos | TKO | 10 (10), 1:02 | Jul 17, 2004 | Chevrolet Amphitheatre, Pittsburgh, Pennsylvania, US | |
| 38 | Win | 37–0–1 | Rubén Galván | UD | 10 | Apr 29, 2004 | Hilton Garden Inn, Canonsburg, Pennsylvania, US | |
| 37 | Draw | 36–0–1 | Leonard Doroftei | SD | 12 | May 17, 2003 | Petersen Center, Pittsburgh, Pennsylvania, US | Retained IBF lightweight title; For WBA lightweight title |
| 36 | Win | 36–0 | Dennis Holbaek Pedersen | UD | 12 | Nov 9, 2002 | Mountaineer Casino, Chester, West Virginia, US | Retained IBF lightweight title |
| 35 | Win | 35–0 | Angel Manfredy | UD | 12 | Mar 9, 2002 | AJ Palumbo Center, Pittsburgh, Pennsylvania, US | Retained IBF lightweight title |
| 34 | Win | 34–0 | Charles Tschorniawsky | UD | 10 | Aug 14, 2001 | Mountaineer Casino, Chester, West Virginia, US | |
| 33 | Win | 33–0 | Joel Perez | UD | 12 | May 8, 2001 | I.C. Light Amphitheater, Pittsburgh, Pennsylvania, US | Retained IBF lightweight title |
| 32 | Win | 32–0 | Billy Irwin | UD | 12 | Dec 16, 2000 | Lawrence Convention Center, Pittsburgh, Pennsylvania, US | Retained IBF lightweight title |
| 31 | Win | 31–0 | Rodney Jones | UD | 10 | Sep 9, 2000 | Mountaineer Casino, Chester, West Virginia, US | |
| 30 | Win | 30–0 | Mike Griffith | TD | 10 (12), 3:00 | May 6, 2000 | Mellon Arena, Pittsburgh, Pennsylvania, US | Retained IBF lightweight title |
| 29 | Win | 29–0 | Victoriano Sosa | UD | 12 | Mar 3, 2000 | Turning Stone Resort & Casino, Verona, New York, US | Retained IBF lightweight title |
| 28 | Win | 28–0 | Renato Cornett | TKO | 11 (12), 0:52 | Dec 17, 1999 | Lawrence Convention Center, Pittsburgh, Pennsylvania, US | Retained IBF lightweight title |
| 27 | Win | 27–0 | Israel Cardona | UD | 12 | Aug 20, 1999 | Mountaineer Casino, Chester, West Virginia, US | Won vacant IBF lightweight title |
| 26 | Win | 26–0 | Eugene Johnson | UD | 8 | Mar 30, 1999 | Monzo's, Monroeville, Pennsylvania, US | |
| 25 | Win | 25–0 | Rocky Martinez | UD | 10 | Jan 22, 1999 | Carmichael's, Chicago, Illinois, US | |
| 24 | Win | 24–0 | Dezi Ford | TKO | 10 (12) | Dec 4, 1998 | Monzo's, Monroeville, Pennsylvania, US | |
| 23 | Win | 23–0 | Sam Girard | UD | 10 | Oct 23, 1998 | Mountaineer Casino, Chester, West Virginia, US | |
| 22 | Win | 22–0 | David Thomas | TKO | 2 (8) | Aug 30, 1998 | Mountaineer Casino, Chester, West Virginia, US | |
| 21 | Win | 21–0 | Jose Aponte | PTS | 12 | Jun 23, 1998 | Mountaineer Casino, Chester, West Virginia, US | |
| 20 | Win | 20–0 | Amado Cabato | TKO | 7 (8) | May 27, 1998 | Avalon Hotel, Monroeville, Pennsylvania, US | |
| 19 | Win | 19–0 | Troy Fletcher | UD | 8 | Mar 26, 1998 | Avalon Hotel, Monroeville, Pennsylvania, US | |
| 18 | Win | 18–0 | Roger Brown | UD | 8 | Dec 11, 1997 | Avalon Hotel, Erie, Pennsylvania, US | |
| 17 | Win | 17–0 | Hector Ramirez | TKO | 2 (?) | Oct 15, 1997 | Monzo's Palace Inn, Monroeville, Pennsylvania, US | |
| 16 | Win | 16–0 | Kino Rodriguez | UD | 6 | Sep 13, 1997 | Thomas & Mack Center, Las Vegas, Nevada, US | |
| 15 | Win | 15–0 | Bernard Harris | UD | 8 | Aug 13, 1997 | Mountaineer Casino, Chester, West Virginia, US | |
| 14 | Win | 14–0 | Julio Cesar Merino | TKO | 5 (?) | May 23, 1997 | Ridgeway, Pennsylvania, US | |
| 13 | Win | 13–0 | Joe Lafontant | PTS | 6 | Mar 1, 1997 | Convention Center, Atlantic City, New Jersey, US | |
| 12 | Win | 12–0 | Greg McLean | KO | 2 (6) | Dec 22, 1996 | Struthers, Ohio, US | |
| 11 | Win | 11–0 | Mark Andreske | TKO | 5 (?) | Nov 21, 1996 | Erie, Pennsylvania, US | |
| 10 | Win | 10–0 | Jeff Whaley | TKO | 2 (8) | Sep 27, 1996 | Mountaineer Casino, Chester, West Virginia, US | |
| 9 | Win | 9–0 | Antonio Gonzalez | UD | 4 | Jun 22, 1996 | Mark Etess Arena, Atlantic City, New Jersey, US | |
| 8 | Win | 8–0 | Calvin Faggins | TKO | 2 (4) | Jun 10, 1996 | Washington, Pennsylvania, US | |
| 7 | Win | 7–0 | Erik Joshua | UD | 4 | May 7, 1996 | St. John's Arena, Steubenville, Ohio, US | |
| 6 | Win | 6–0 | Julio Ibarra | TKO | 3 (?) | Mar 31, 1996 | Washington, Pennsylvania, US | |
| 5 | Win | 5–0 | Michael Lopez | RTD | 3 (4), 3:00 | Feb 20, 1996 | Mahi Temple Shrine Auditorium, Miami, Florida, US | |
| 4 | Win | 4–0 | Lacebian Crockett | KO | 1 (?) | Dec 13, 1995 | Holiday Inn Metroplex, Liberty Township, Ohio, US | |
| 3 | Win | 3–0 | Anthony Hardy | UD | 4 | Nov 15, 1995 | Erie, Pennsylvania, US | |
| 2 | Win | 2–0 | Nathaniel Hardy | TKO | 2 (?) | Nov 7, 1995 | Mountaineer Casino, Chester, West Virginia, US | |
| 1 | Win | 1–0 | Steve Maddux | PTS | 4 | Oct 18, 1995 | Sheraton Station Square, Pittsburgh, Pennsylvania, US | |

== See also ==
- Billy Conn, another professional boxer from Pittsburgh nicknamed "the Pittsburgh Kid".

Sporting positions
World boxing titles
| Vacant Title last held by Shane Mosley | IBF lightweight champion 20 August 1999 – 26 June 2003; Vacated | Vacant Title next held by Javier Jáuregui |
