= Ričardas Kuncaitis =

Lithuanian boxer (born 1993)

Ričardas Kuncaitis (born 28 June 1993) is a Lithuanian boxer. He represented Lithuania at 2010 Summer Youth Olympics and won a gold medal.

In 2011 for the first time Kuncaitis represented Lithuania in World Championships and lost in first round. In 2013 Kuncaitis participated in Summer Universiade, but lost in first round.

== Achievements ==
| Year | Competition | Venue | Position | Notes |
|---|---|---|---|---|
| 2010 | Youth World Amateur Boxing Championships | Baku, Azerbaijan | 3rd | |
| 2010 | Summer Youth Olympics | Singapore City, Singapore | 1st | |
| 2011 | Lithuanian Championships | Kaunas, Lithuania | 2nd | |
| 2011 | Boxing Youth European Championships | Dublin, Ireland | 1st | |
| 2011 | World Championships | Baku, Azerbaijan | 1R | |
| 2013 | Universiade | Kazan, Russia | 1R | |
