= 2011 World Amateur Boxing Championships – Middleweight =

Boxing competitions

The Middleweight competition was the fourth heaviest class featured at the 2011 World Amateur Boxing Championships, held at the Heydar Aliyev Sports and Exhibition Complex. Boxers were limited to a maximum of 75 kilograms (165 lb) in body mass.

== Medalists ==
| Gold | Evhen Khytrov (UKR) |
| Silver | Ryota Murata (JPN) |
| Bronze | Esquiva Florentino (BRA) |
| Bronze | Bogdan Juratoni (ROU) |

== Seeds ==
1. (Uzbekistan) Abbos Atoev (first round)
2. (Armenia) Andranik Hakobyan (quarterfinals)
3. (Ecuador) Jaime Cortez (second round)
4. (Russia) Artem Chebotarev (second round)
5. (Algeria) Abdelmalek Rahou (first round)
6. (France) Michel Tavares (second round)
7. (India) Vijender Singh (first round)
8. (Republic of Ireland) Darren O'Neill (quarterfinals)

== Draw ==
=== Finals ===
Semifinals
1 | Ryota Murata (JPN) | 24
4 | Esquiva Florentino (BRA) | 11
3 | Evhen Khytrov (UKR) | RSC
2 | Bogdan Juratoni (ROU)

Final
Ryota Murata (JPN) | 22
Evhen Khytrov (UKR) | 24

=== Round of 128 ===
Round of 128
| | Score | |
|---|---|---|
| Leandro Sanchez (ARG) | RSC | Ryota Murata (JPN) |
| Fatlum Zhuta (ALB) | 29–14 | Ilias Savvidis (GRE) |
| Victor Cotiujanschi (MDA) | RSC | Rowain Christopher (DMA) |

=== Top half ===
==== Section 1 ====
First round
Abbos Atoev (UZB)
Ryota Murata (JPN) | RSC
Badreddine Haddioui (MAR) | 9
Mohammad Sattarpour (IRI) | 15
Jaba Khositashvili (GEO) | 23
Suriya Prasathinmphimai (THA) | 11
Adem Kılıççı (TUR) | 10
Stefan Hartel (GER) | 13
Islomzhon Dalibaev (KGZ) | 14
Muhamad Haron (MAS) | 6
Keithland King (VIN)
Mladen Manev (BUL) | RSC
Kaupo Arro (EST) | 3
Mohamed Hikal (EGY) | 12
Glodi Eneste (NOR) | 5
Darren O'Neill (IRL) | 16

Second round
Ryota Murata (JPN) | 22
Mohammad Sattarpour (IRI) | 11
Jaba Khositashvili (GEO) | 6
Stefan Hartel (GER) | 22
Islomzhon Dalibaev (KGZ) | 10
Mladen Manev (BUL) | 17
Mohamed Hikal (EGY) | 13
Darren O'Neill (IRL) | 15

Third round
Ryota Murata (JPN) | 18
Stefan Hartel (GER) | 15
Mladen Manev (BUL) | 12
Darren O'Neill (IRL) | 19

Quarterfinals
Ryota Murata (JPN) | 18
Darren O'Neill (IRL) | 9

==== Section 2 ====
First round
Abdelmalek Rahou (ALG)
Artem Masliy (ISR) | WO
Danabek Suzhanov (KAZ) | 24
Yang Yu Ting (TPE) | 7
Hzam Nabah (QAT)
Jesse Hart (USA) | RSC
Junior Castillo (DOM) | 13
Sobirjon Nazarov (TJK) | 14
Mamadou Fall (SEN) | 9
Esquiva Florentino (BRA) | 25
Robert Jankovski (AUS) | 13
Jovette Jean (SEY) | 6
Anthony Ogogo (ENG) | 17
Woo Sung (KOR) | 7
Muza Ngozo (SWZ)
Artem Chebotarev (RUS) | RSC

Second round
Artem Masliy (ISR) | 8
Danabek Suzhanov (KAZ) | 37
Jesse Hart (USA) | 13
Sobirjon Nazarov (TJK) | 8
Esquiva Florentino (BRA) | 15
Robert Jankovski (AUS) | 9
Anthony Ogogo (ENG) | 12
Artem Chebotarev (RUS) | 11

Third round
Danabek Suzhanov (KAZ) | 17
Jesse Hart (USA) | 15
Esquiva Florentino (BRA) | 17
Anthony Ogogo (ENG) | 12

Quarterfinals
Danabek Suzhanov (KAZ) | 10
Esquiva Florentino (BRA) | 13

=== Bottom half ===
==== Section 3 ====
First round
Jaime Cortez (ECU) | 18
Fatlum Zhuta (ALB) | 15
Aleksandar Drenovak (SRB) | +21
Chuuluntumur Tumurkhuyag (MGL) | 21
Peter Mullenberg (NED) | 13
Zhang Jianting (CHN) | 14
Luca Podda (ITA) | 7
Mikalai Vesialou (BLR) | 17
Joseph St Pierre (MRI) | 16
Vladimir Milevskij (LTU) | 26
Nursahat Pazzyyev (TKM)
Evhen Khytrov (UKR) | RSC
Zoltán Harcsa (HUN) | 22
Jose Bernal (ESA) | 8
Juan Rodriguez (VEN) | 20
Michel Tavares (FRA) | 21

Second round
Jaime Cortez (ECU) | 9
Aleksandar Drenovak (SRB) | 13
Zhang Jianting (CHN) | 17
Mikalai Vesialou (BLR) | 14
Vladimir Milevskij (LTU) | 13
Evhen Khytrov (UKR) | 21
Zoltán Harcsa (HUN) | 16
Michel Tavares (FRA) | 10

Third round
Aleksandar Drenovak (SRB) | 18
Zhang Jianting (CHN) | 16
Evhen Khytrov (UKR) | RSC
Zoltán Harcsa (HUN)

Quarterfinals
Aleksandar Drenovak (SRB) | 15
Evhen Khytrov (UKR) | 34

==== Section 4 ====
First round
Vijender Singh (IND) | 9
Emilio Correa (CUB) | 16
Emmanuel Quarshie (GHA) | DSQ
Arbi Chakaev (AUT)
Tibor Varga (SVK) | 21
Arthur Langelier (LCA) | 9
Bogdan Juratoni (ROU) | 28
Matej Dujić (CRO) | 11
Abdulfatah Julaidan (KSA)
Joseph Blackbourn (NZL) | RSC
Reece Shagourie (JAM) | 19
Juan Mercado (MEX) | 20
Danijel Topalović (BIH) | 9
Tomasz Jabłoński (POL) | 16
Victor Cotiujanschi (MDA) | 10
Andranik Hakobyan (ARM) | 17

Second round
Emilio Correa (CUB) | 16
Arbi Chakaev (AUT) | 4
Tibor Varga (SVK) | 2
Bogdan Juratoni (ROU) | 12
Joseph Blackbourn (NZL) | 10
Juan Mercado (MEX) | 19
Tomasz Jabłoński (POL) | 12
Andranik Hakobyan (ARM) | 18

Third round
Emilio Correa (CUB) | 24
Bogdan Juratoni (ROU) | 26
Juan Mercado (MEX)
Andranik Hakobyan (ARM) | RSCI

Quarterfinals
Bogdan Juratoni (ROU) | 21
Andranik Hakobyan (ARM) | 17
