= Boxing at the 2010 Asian Games – Men's 75 kg =

Boxing competitions

Men's 75 kg at the 2010 Asian Games
- Venue: Lingnan Mingzhu Gymnasium
- Date: 16–26 November 2010
- Competitors: 17 from 17 nations

Medalists
gold medal	Vijender Singh	India
silver medal	Abbos Atoev	Uzbekistan
bronze medal	Danabek Suzhanov	Kazakhstan
bronze medal	Mohammad Sattarpour	Iran

The men's middleweight (75 kilograms) event at the 2010 Asian Games took place from 16 to 26 November 2010 at Lingnan Mingzhu Gymnasium, Foshan, China.

== Schedule ==
All times are China Standard Time (UTC+08:00)

Date	Time	Event
Tuesday, 16 November 2010	14:00	Round of 32
Wednesday, 17 November 2010	19:00	Round of 16
Saturday, 20 November 2010	14:00	Quarterfinals
Wednesday, 24 November 2010	19:00	Semifinals
Friday, 26 November 2010	19:00	Final

== Results ==
Legend

- KO — Won by knockout
- RSC — Won by referee stop contest
- RSCH — Won by referee stop contest head blow

=== Final ===
Final
Abbos Atoev (UZB)	0
Vijender Singh (IND)	7

=== Top half ===
Round of 32

Round of 16
Asadullo Boimurodov (KGZ)	KO
Mustafa Farrah (SYR)
Danabek Suzhanov (KAZ)	RSC
Sobhi Sukkari (PLE)
Zhang Jianting (CHN)	7
Abbos Atoev (UZB)	8
Suriya Prasathinphimai (THA)	1
Narmandakhyn Shinebayar (MGL)	2

Quarterfinals
Asadullo Boimurodov (KGZ)	3
Danabek Suzhanov (KAZ)	9
Abbos Atoev (UZB)	10
Narmandakhyn Shinebayar (MGL)	1

Semifinals
Danabek Suzhanov (KAZ)	5
Abbos Atoev (UZB)	9

=== Bottom half ===
Round of 32
Wesam Al-Alawi (KSA)
Yang Yu-ting (TPE)	RSCH

Round of 16
Mohammad Sattarpour (IRI)	16
Nisar Khan (PAK)	1
Mohd Fairuz Azwan (MAS)	5
Waheed Abdul-Ridha (IRQ)	12
Cho Deok-jin (KOR)	10
Aliasker Başirow (TKM)	4
Vijender Singh (IND)	9
Yang Yu-ting (TPE)	4

Quarterfinals
Mohammad Sattarpour (IRI)	8
Waheed Abdul-Ridha (IRQ)	5
Cho Deok-jin (KOR)	2
Vijender Singh (IND)	13

Semifinals
Mohammad Sattarpour (IRI)	7
Vijender Singh (IND)	10
