= Boxing at the 2006 Asian Games – Men's 75 kg =

Boxing competitions

Men's 75 kg at the 2006 Asian Games
- Venue: Aspire Hall 5
- Date: 5–12 December 2006
- Competitors: 15 from 15 nations

Medalists
| gold medal | Elshod Rasulov | Uzbekistan |
| silver medal | Bakhtiyar Artayev | Kazakhstan |
| bronze medal | Zhang Jianting | China |
| bronze medal | Vijender Singh | India |

The men's middleweight (75 kilograms) event at the 2006 Asian Games took place from 5 to 12 December 2006 at Aspire Hall 5, Doha, Qatar.

== Schedule ==
All times are Arabia Standard Time (UTC+03:00)

| Date | Time | Event |
|---|---|---|
| Tuesday, 5 December 2006 | 14:00 | Preliminary |
| Friday, 8 December 2006 | 14:00 | Quarterfinals |
| Sunday, 10 December 2006 | 14:00 | Semifinals |
| Tuesday, 12 December 2006 | 14:00 | Final |

== Results ==
Legend

- RET — Won by retirement
- RSC — Won by referee stop contest
- RSCI — Won by referee stop contest injury
- RSCO — Won by referee stop contest outscored

Preliminary
Sarvar Khojimuradov (TJK)
Zhang Jianting (CHN) | RSCO
Davran Khabirov (KGZ) | RSC
Abdulla Al-Hadi (QAT)
Homayoun Amiri (IRI)
Elshod Rasulov (UZB) | RET
Bakhtiyar Artayev (KAZ) | 24
Ryota Murata (JPN) | 5
Najd Salloum (LIB)
Cho Deok-jin (KOR) | RSCO
Şukuralla Atajanow (TKM) | RSCI
Suriya Prasathinphimai (THA)
Mustafa Farrah (SYR) | 18
Vijender Singh (IND) | 34

Quarterfinals
Allah Bux (PAK)
Zhang Jianting (CHN) | RSCO
Davran Khabirov (KGZ)
Elshod Rasulov (UZB) | RSCO
Bakhtiyar Artayev (KAZ) | RSCO
Cho Deok-jin (KOR)
Şukuralla Atajanow (TKM)
Vijender Singh (IND) | RSCO

Semifinals
Zhang Jianting (CHN) | 14
Elshod Rasulov (UZB) | 25
Bakhtiyar Artayev (KAZ) | 29
Vijender Singh (IND) | 24

Final
Elshod Rasulov (UZB) | 32
Bakhtiyar Artayev (KAZ) | 22
