= Boxing at the 2012 Summer Olympics – Men's middleweight =

Men's middleweight boxing at the Games of the XXX Olympiad
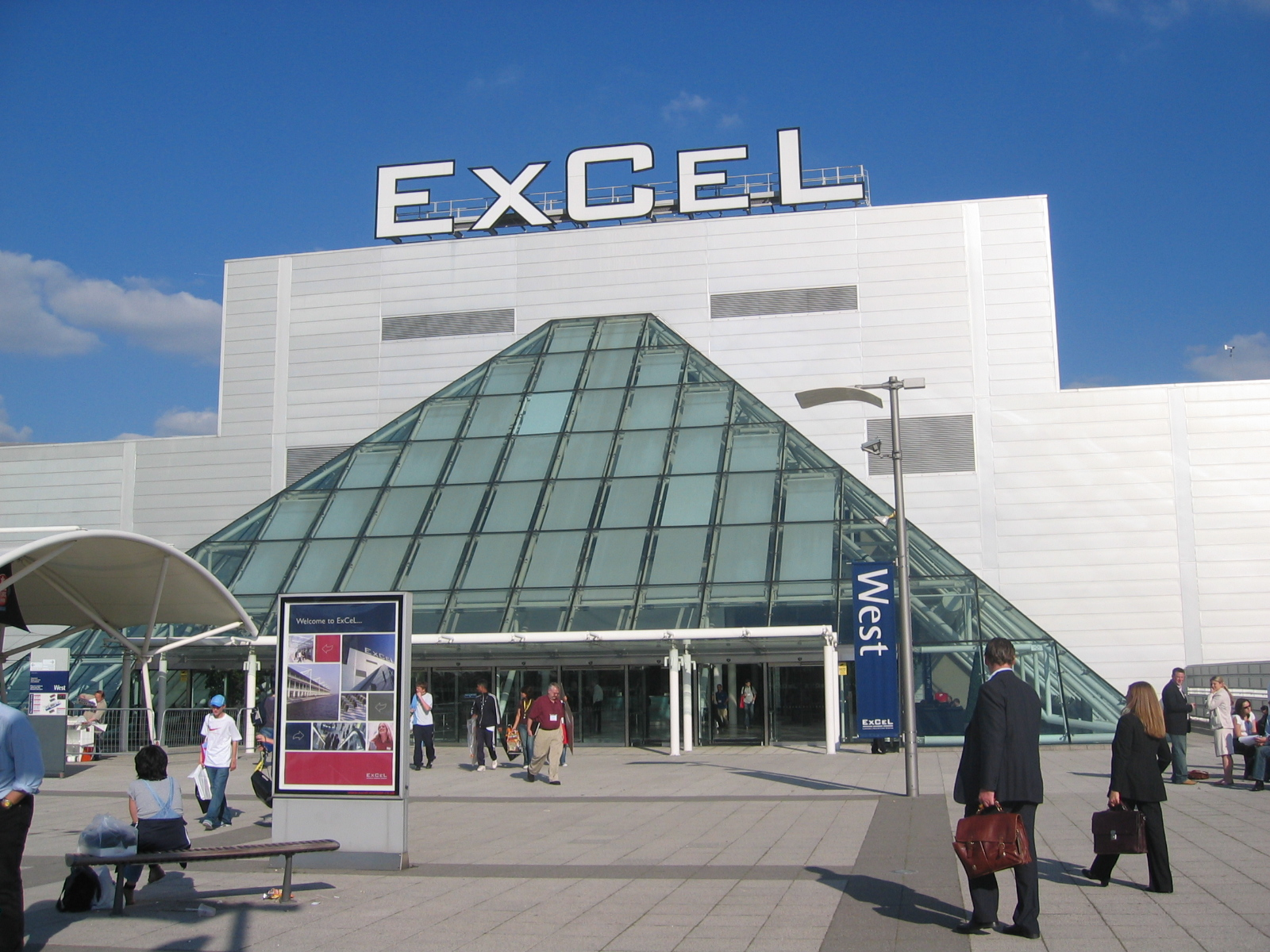
- ExCel Exhibition Centre
- Venue: ExCeL Exhibition Centre
- Date: 28 July to 12 August 2012
- Competitors: 28 from 28 nations

Medalists
1st place, gold medalist(s)		Ryōta Murata	Japan
2nd place, silver medalist(s)		Esquiva Falcão	Brazil
3rd place, bronze medalist(s)		Anthony Ogogo	Great Britain
3rd place, bronze medalist(s)		Abbos Atoev	Uzbekistan

The men's middleweight boxing competition at the 2012 Olympic Games in London was held from 28 July to 12 August at the ExCeL Exhibition Centre.

Twenty-eight boxers from 28 nations were competed. Ryōta Murata, representing Japan, won the gold medal, defeating Brazil's Esquiva Falcão in the final. Both semi-finalists, Anthony Ogogo and Abbos Atoev from Great Britain and Uzbekistan respectively, were awarded bronze medals.

== Competition format ==
The competition consisted of a single-elimination tournament. Bronze medals were awarded to both semi-final losers. Bouts were three rounds of three minutes each.

== Schedule ==
All times are British Summer Time (UTC+1)

Date	Time	Round
Saturday 28 July 2012	15:00 & 22:00	Round of 32
Thursday 2 August 2012	14:30 & 21:30	Round of 16
Monday 6 August 2012	21:30	Quarter-finals
Friday 10 August 2012	15:00	Semi-finals
Saturday 11 August 2012	21:45	Final

== Results ==
=== Finals ===
Semi-finals
Anthony Ogogo (GBR)	9
Esquiva Falcão (BRA)	16
Abbos Atoev (UZB)	12
Ryōta Murata (JPN)	13

Final
Esquiva Falcão (BRA)	13
Ryōta Murata (JPN)	14

Round of 32
Anthony Ogogo (GBR)	13
Junior Castillo (DOM)	6
Muideen Akanji (NGR)	6
Darren O'Neill (IRL)	15
Stefan Härtel (GER)	18
Enrique Collazo (PUR)	10
Mujandjae Kasuto (NAM)	11
Sobirjon Nazarov (TJK)	8
José Espinoza (VEN)	13
Zoltán Harcsa (HUN)	16
Soltan Migitinov (AZE)	20
Mohamed Hikal (EGY)	12

Round of 16
Evhen Khytrov (UKR)	18
Anthony Ogogo (GBR)	18+
Darren O'Neill (IRL)	12
Stefan Härtel (GER)	19
Mujandjae Kasuto (NAM)	7
Zoltán Harcsa (HUN)	16
Soltan Migitinov (AZE)	11
Esquiva Falcão (BRA)	24

Quarter-finals
Anthony Ogogo (GBR)	15
Stefan Härtel (GER)	10
Zoltán Harcsa (HUN)	10
Esquiva Falcão (BRA)	14

Semi-finals
Anthony Ogogo (GBR)	9
Esquiva Falcão (BRA)	16

=== Bottom half ===
Round of 32
Abbos Atoev (UZB)	11
Badreddine Haddioui (MAR)	9
Andranik Hakobyan (ARM)
Terrell Gausha (USA)	RSC
Vijender Singh (IND)	14
Danabek Suzhanov (KAZ)	10
Adem Kılıççı (TUR)	DSQ
Nursahat Pazziyev (TKM)	7
Aleksandar Drenovak (SRB)	13
Marlo Delgado (ECU)	12
Jesse Ross (AUS)	11
Abdelmalek Rahou (ALG)	13

Round of 16
Bogdan Juratoni (ROU)	10
Abbos Atoev (UZB)	12
Terrell Gausha (USA)	15
Vijender Singh (IND)	16
Adem Kılıççı (TUR)	DSQ
Aleksandar Drenovak (SRB)	11
Abdelmalek Rahou (ALG)	12
Ryōta Murata (JPN)	21

Quarter-finals
Abbos Atoev (UZB)	17
Vijender Singh (IND)	13
Adem Kılıççı (TUR)	DSQ
Ryōta Murata (JPN)	17

Semi-finals
Abbos Atoev (UZB)	12
Ryōta Murata (JPN)	13
