= Ryōta Murata =

Japanese boxer (born 1986)

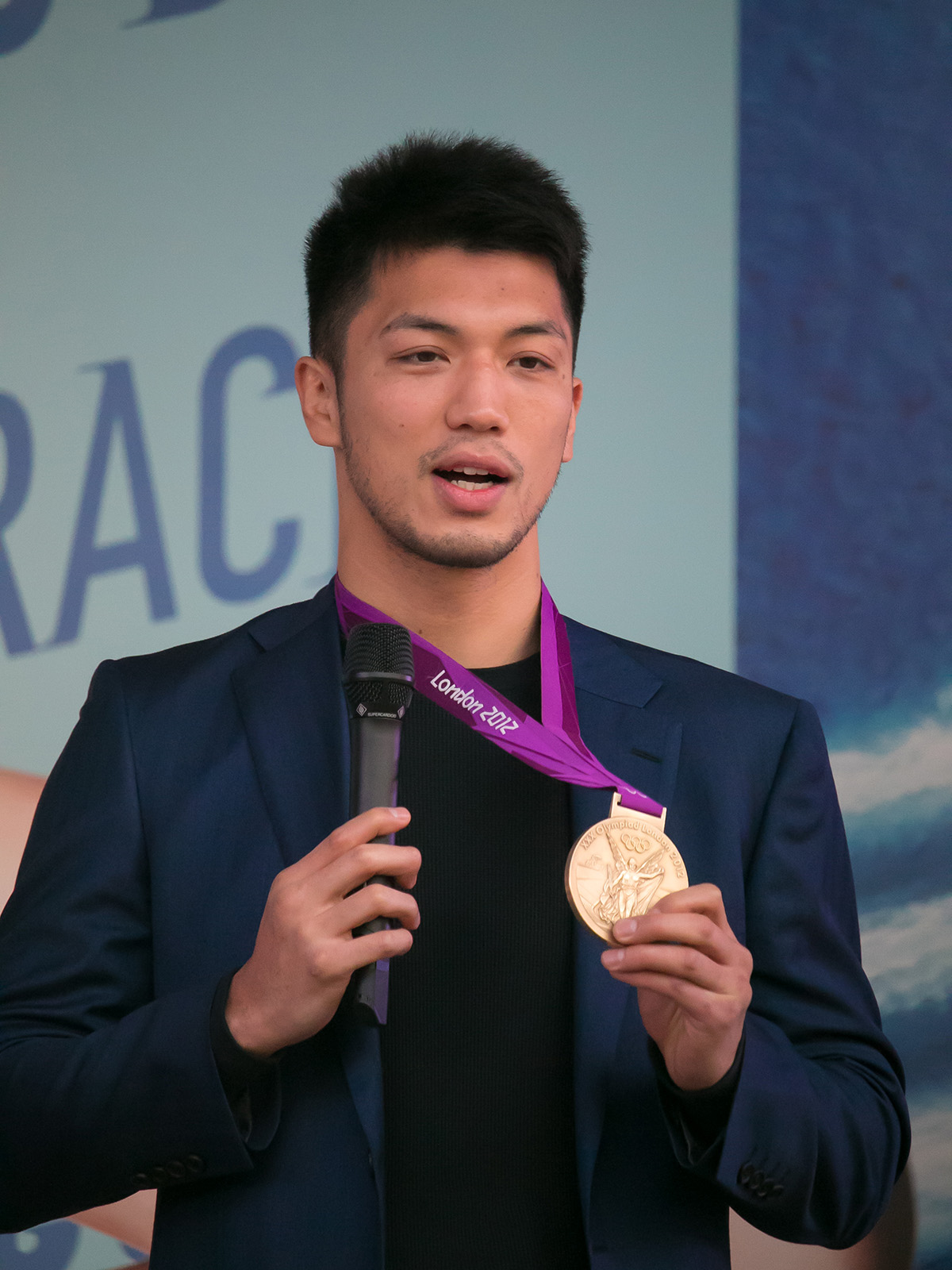
- Ryōta Murata in 2017

Personal information
- Nickname: Golden Fist
- Born: 村田 諒太; 12 January 1986 (age 40) Nara, Japan
- Height: 6 ft (183 cm)
- Weight: Middleweight

Boxing career
- Reach: 75 in (191 cm)
- Stance: Orthodox

Boxing record
- Total fights: 19
- Wins: 16
- Win by KO: 13
- Losses: 3
Medal record
Men's amateur boxing
Representing Japan
Olympic Games
Gold medal – first place	2012 London	Middleweight
World Championships
Silver medal – second place	2011 Baku	Middleweight
Asian Championships
Bronze medal – third place	2005 Ho Chi Minh City	Middleweight

Ryōta Murata (村田 諒太, Murata Ryōta; born 12 January 1986) is a Japanese former professional boxer who competed from 2013 to 2022. He held the WBA (Regular) middleweight title twice between 2017 and 2021, and the WBA (Super) middleweight title from 2021 to 2022. As an amateur, he won a silver medal at the 2011 World Championships, and gold the following year at the 2012 Olympics.

== Amateur career ==
Murata started boxing in the first grade of junior high school. His then trainer was Hiroaki Takami, who competed at the 1984 Summer Olympics. Two years later, he started attending Shinko Boxing Gym in Osaka from his home in Nara City. He was trained under the former Japanese super lightweight champion Hiromu Kuwata at that gym for one year.

He proceeded to Minami-Kyoto High School and was coached there by Maekawa Takemoto, who served as the coach of the 1996 Summer Olympics in Atlanta. Murata went on to capture five national titles. Takemoto died in 2010, at the age of 50.

However, after his admission to Toyo University, he suffered a number of DQ losses in the university league. At that time, he trained at the Physical Training School of the Self Defense Forces, on the recommendation of Takemoto.

After winning the All-Japan Amateur Boxing Championships in the first grade of university in 2004, he captured the bronze medal in the 2005 Asian Amateur Boxing Championships in Ho Chi Minh City, and the silver medal in the 2005 King's Cup in Bangkok. After that, Murata went on an undefeated streak in his country, winning the All-Japan Amateur Boxing Championships also in 2007, 2009, 2010, and 2011. However, he was defeated in the preliminary round by Nikolajs Grisunins at the 2005 World Amateur Boxing Championships, and again in the preliminary round by Bakhtiyar Artayev in the 2006 Asian Games.

In the 2007 World Amateur Boxing Championships he won against Donatas Bondorovas in the first round, but lost to Shawn Estrada in the second round.

At the 2008 1st Asian Olympic Qualifying Tournament in Bangkok, Thailand, he won over Narmandakh Shinebayar in the quarterfinal but lost to Elshod Rasulov in the semifinal. In the 2nd AIBA Asian 2008 Olympic Qualifying Tournament in Astana, Kazakhstan, he was eliminated in the quarterfinal by Homayoun Amiri and ended in the seventh place.

Murata retired as a boxer after failing to qualify for the 2008 Summer Olympics. After graduating from the university, he started coaching at the boxing club while working as an employee of his alma mater. A year and a half later, he resumed his boxing career.

In 2010, he secured the bronze medal by winning over Udai Al-Hindawi in the quarterfinal of the China Open Tournament in Guiyang, China, but lost to Husan Baymatov in the semifinal. In the 2010 Kazakhstan President's Cup in Astana, he won over Levan Guledani in the preliminary round but lost to Danabek Suzhanov in the quarterfinal.

In July 2011, he won the gold medal at the 21st President's Cup in Jakarta.

At the 2011 World Amateur Boxing Championships, Murata won over his preliminary contest over Leandro Sanchez (24–11). In a big upset, Murata stopped two-time world champion Abbos Atoev in the first round. He subsequently defeated Mohammad Sattarpour (22–11, in the second round) and Stefan Härtel (18–15, in the third round). By beating Härtel, Murata secured qualification for the 2012 Summer Olympics. In the quarter-final, he beat Darren O'Neill (18-9). Finally he defeated Esquiva Falcão (24–11) to qualify for the final. Murata's run came to an end against Evhen Khytrov, losing a close match (22–24) and taking home the silver medal.

=== 2012 Olympics ===
In the 2012 Summer Olympics, second-seeded Murata defeated Algeria's Abdelmalek Rahou 21–12 in the round of 16 at the ExCeL London on 2 August 2012. He subsequently beat Turkey's Adem Kılıççı 17–13 in the quarter-finals on 6 August, and also outpointed Uzbekistan's Abbos Atoev 13–12 in the semi-finals on 10 August. In the final on 11 August, he beat the Esquiva Falcão with a score of 14–13 and took the gold medal.

After winning the quarter-finals, Murata and Florentino were both assured of the first men's boxing medal for their countries since the 1968 Summer Olympics. It was a tough, close bout.

Murata is the hundredth gold medalist for Japan in their Olympic history. His is Japan's first boxing gold medal since Takao Sakurai won in the bantamweight class in 1964, and also is the first-ever boxing medal in a weight class other than bantamweight or flyweight.

The Brazilian Olympic Committee asked the International Boxing Association (AIBA) for a review of the final, but the AIBA turned down the request.

Murata finished his amateur career with a record of 119–18 (89 RSC).

==== Results ====
Men's Middleweight (75 kg)

1. Round of 16: Ryōta Murata, Japan (21) def Abdelmalek Rahou, Algeria (12)
2. Quarterfinals: Ryōta Murata, Japan (17) def Adem Kılıççı, Turkey (13)
3. Semi-finals: Ryōta Murata, Japan (13) def Abbos Atoev, Uzbekistan (12)
4. Final: Ryōta Murata, Japan (14) def Esquiva Falcão, Brazil (13)

== Professional career ==
Murata registered with Misako Boxing Gym in April 2013, and signed with Top Rank in June. He also asked Teiken Promotions for cooperation in promotion. Murata is sponsored by Dentsu. Before turning professional, Murata had declined participation in AIBA Pro Boxing by saying that he intended to retire as a boxer. Upon turning professional, Murata was banned from Japan Amateur Boxing Federation (JABF) for his disloyal behavior in February 2013.

Qualified as a professional boxer in April 2013, he was cleared to fight in eight or more round bouts. His professional debut took place in a six-round bout at a 161 lb catchweight against Akio Shibata at the Ariake Coliseum on 25 August 2013. Murata won the bout by a second-round technical knockout. Murata went on to win his first four fights by knockout.

Murata's first fight in the U.S. took place in November 2015 against Gunnar Jackson. He won the fight via unanimous decision (99-91, 98-92, 97-93), outworking Jackson throughout most of the bout.

Murata (8-0, 5 KOs), who was ranked fifth in the WBC and IBF middleweight ratings, ranked eighth in the WBO middleweight ratings and ranked eleventh in the WBA middleweight ratings at the time, faced Gaston Alejandro Vega (24-10-1, 10 KOs) of Argentina on 30 January in Shanghai, on the under card of Chinese superstar Zou Shiming against Natan Santana Coutinho. Murata won the fight by KO in the second round.

=== WBA (Regular) middleweight champion ===
==== Murata vs. N'Dam ====
After 12 consecutive victories, Murata fought for the vacant WBA (Regular) title against Hassan N'Dam N'Jikam on 27 May 2017. Murata lost a very controversial split decision (116-111, 115-112, 110-117), in a match which many thought he'd won. N'Dam N'Jikam was knocked down in Round 4 but survived and got the decision. The two judges who scored the fight for N'Dam N'Jikam were immediately suspended and WBA president Gilberto Mendoza issued a public apology. A rematch was immediately ordered by the WBA, and scheduled for 22 October.

==== Murata vs. N'Dam II ====
On 22 October, Murata decisively beat N'Dam N'Jikam, whose team threw in the towel after round 7. Murata's body attack wore his opponent down, he also hurt him with a series of combinations. The fight was attended by 8,500 people at the Ryōgoku Kokugikan. This was N'Dam N'Jikam's first stoppage loss.

After the fight, Murata said, "I know that you're going to have a rougher time after you win a title. And there are other very strong champions in this weight class at other organizations. The people here know it. I will aim to be at their level." With the win, Murata became Japan's first Olympic medalist to win a world title, as well as the first Japanese middleweight world champion since Shinji Takehara.

==== Murata vs. Blandamura ====
On 15 April, Murata retained his secondary middleweight world title with a one-sided eighth-round knockout of Emanuele Blandamura at the Yokohama Arena in Yokohama, Japan. Blandamura was ranked #6 by the WBA at middleweight. Defending his 160-pound belt for the first time since knocking out Hassan N'Dam in the seventh round of their October rematch to claim the title, Murata had a similarly easy time with Blandamura.

==== Murata vs. Brant ====
Murata failed to defend his WBA middleweight world title and suffered his second defeat on 20 October in Las Vegas, losing to mandatory challenger Rob Brant of the U.S. by unanimous decision, 118-110, 119-109 and 119-109. Brant was ranked #3 by the WBA and #11 by the IBF at the time. Brant threw over 1,200 punches to get the decision, wearing Murata out and down over the course of the fight.

==== Murata vs. Brant II ====
Brant made his second defense of WBA "regular" middleweight title against Murata on 12 July 2019 at Edion Arena in Osaka, Japan. Murata regained the WBA "regular" middleweight title with a stunning 64 power punches he landed on Brant in Round 2, forcing referee Luis Pabon to stop the bout 2 minutes 34 seconds into the round. Murata's 64 power punches connected were the second most by a middleweight in a round next to Mike McCallum 's 74 landed punches in a fifth-round TKO of Nicky Walker in 1991.

==== Murata vs. Butler ====
Murata defended his regained title on 23 May December 2019 at the Yokohama Arena against hard-punching Canadian contender Steven Butler (27-1). Butler was ranked #8 by the WBA at middleweight. Murata's power showed up right from the start, but Butler managed to keep up with the champion in the early rounds using his long reach and fast combinations. However, Murata's constant offense, sharp jab and powerful rights started to wear down Butler in round four. Near the end of Round 5, Murata drove Butler to the ropes and began to unleash a series of hard punches, before landing a devastating left hook that caused Butler to crash down on the canvas. Referee Rafael Ramos immediately halted the contest, thus giving Murata the victory by TKO.

=== WBA (Super) middleweight champion ===
In January 2021, Murata was elevated to the status of full WBA (Super) middleweight champion. The position had previously been vacant after the previous Super champion Canelo Álvarez had vacated the title to move up to the super-middleweight division.

==== Murata vs. Golovkin ====
After multiple rumors suggesting that Murata was set to take on IBF and IBO champion Gennady Golovkin in a unification match, it was announced on 27 October 2021 that a deal had finally been agreed between the two to stage the bout at the Saitama Super Arena in Saitama, Japan on 29 December 2021. The fight eventually took place on 9 April 2022. Murata suffered a ninth-round TKO loss. Murata started fast and seemed to control the pace for some of the early rounds until Golovkin took over by the mid-rounds. Golovkin inflicted tremendous punishment on Murata in round eight. The end came in round nine when after a hard right hand dropped Murata, the Japanese's corner threw in their towel, giving Golovkin a ninth-round technical knockout win.

==== Retirement ====
Murata announced his retirement at the age of 37, saying he had run out of challenges following his loss in 2022 to Golovkin. Murata told reporters in Tokyo he had "always thought that the Golovkin fight would be the last one. After that, I couldn't really find anything more that I wanted out of boxing. Winning the [Olympic] gold medal was a starting point, becoming a world champion was a starting point... I regard everything as a new beginning. As such, today is a new start. From here on, I want to build a solid future. As of today, professional boxer Ryota Murata will be retiring. Thank you to everyone who has supported me."

== Personal life ==
Murata was married in May 2010. His son was born in May 2011.

== Professional boxing record ==
19 fights	16 wins	3 losses
By knockout	13	1
By decision	3	2

No.	Result	Record	Opponent	Type	Round, time	Date	Location	Notes
19	Loss	16–3	Gennady Golovkin	TKO	9 (12), 2:11	9 Apr 2022	Super Arena, Saitama, Japan	Lost WBA (Super) middleweight title; For IBF and IBO middleweight titles
18	Win	16–2	Steven Butler	TKO	5 (12), 2:45	23 Dec 2019	Yokohama Arena, Kanagawa, Japan	Retained WBA (Regular) middleweight title
17	Win	15–2	Rob Brant	TKO	2 (12), 2:34	12 Jul 2019	EDION Arena, Osaka, Japan	Won WBA (Regular) middleweight title
16	Loss	14–2	Rob Brant	UD	12	20 Oct 2018	Park MGM, Paradise, Nevada, U.S.	Lost WBA (Regular) middleweight title
15	Win	14–1	Emanuele Blandamura	TKO	8 (12), 2:56	15 Apr 2018	Yokohama Arena, Kanagawa, Japan	Retained WBA (Regular) middleweight title
14	Win	13–1	Hassan N'Dam N'Jikam	RTD	7 (12), 3:00	22 Oct 2017	Ryōgoku Kokugikan, Tokyo, Japan	Won WBA (Regular) middleweight title
13	Loss	12–1	Hassan N'Dam N'Jikam	SD	12	20 May 2017	Ariake Colosseum, Tokyo, Japan	For vacant WBA (Regular) middleweight title
12	Win	12–0	Bruno Sandoval	KO	3 (10), 2:53	30 Dec 2016	Ariake Colosseum, Tokyo, Japan	
11	Win	11–0	George Tahdooahnippah	TKO	1 (10), 1:52	23 Jul 2016	MGM Grand Garden Arena, Paradise, Nevada, U.S.	
10	Win	10–0	Felipe Santos Pedroso	TKO	4 (10), 2:50	14 May 2016	Convention and Exhibition Centre, Hong Kong, SAR	
9	Win	9–0	Gastón Vega	KO	2 (10), 2:23	30 Jan 2016	Oriental Sports Center, Shanghai, China	
8	Win	8–0	Gunnar Jackson	UD	10	7 Nov 2015	Thomas & Mack Center, Paradise, Nevada, U.S.	
7	Win	7–0	Douglas Damiao Ataide	TKO	5 (10), 0:38	1 May 2015	Ota City General Gymnasium, Tokyo, Japan	
6	Win	6–0	Jessie Nicklow	UD	10	30 Dec 2014	Metropolitan Gym, Tokyo, Japan	
5	Win	5–0	Adrian Luna Flores	UD	10	5 Sep 2014	Yoyogi National Gymnasium, Tokyo, Japan	
4	Win	4–0	Jesús Ángel Nerio	KO	6 (10), 2:35	22 May 2014	Shimazu Arena, Kyoto, Japan	
3	Win	3–0	Carlos Nascimento	TKO	4 (8), 0:43	22 Feb 2014	Cotai Arena, Macau, SAR	
2	Win	2–0	Dave Peterson	TKO	8 (8), 1:20	6 Dec 2013	Ryōgoku Kokugikan, Tokyo, Japan	
1	Win	1–0	Akio Shibata	TKO	2 (6), 2:24	25 Aug 2013	Ariake Colosseum, Tokyo, Japan	

== See also ==
- October 2011 in sports#Boxing
- Boxing at the 2012 Summer Olympics – Qualification
- Japan at the 2012 Summer Olympics
- Chronological summary of the 2012 Summer Olympics#Day 15: Sat 11 August
- List of Olympic medalists in boxing#Middleweight
- List of 2012 Summer Olympics medal winners#Boxing
- List of Japanese boxing world champions

Sporting positions
Minor world boxing titles
Preceded by Hassan N'Dam N'Jikam	WBA (Regular) middleweight champion 22 October 2017 – 20 October 2018	Succeeded by Rob Brant
Preceded by Rob Brant	WBA (Regular) middleweight champion 12 July 2019 – 1 January 2021; Promoted	Vacant Title next held by Erislandy Lara
World boxing titles
Preceded by Canelo Álvarez as Super champion	WBA middleweight champion 1 – 6 January 2021; Promoted	Vacant Title next held by Erislandy Lara
Vacant Title last held by Canelo Álvarez	WBA middleweight champion Super title 6 January 2021 – 9 April 2022	Succeeded by Gennadiy Golovkin
