= Soltan Migitinov =

Azerbaijani boxer (born 1988)

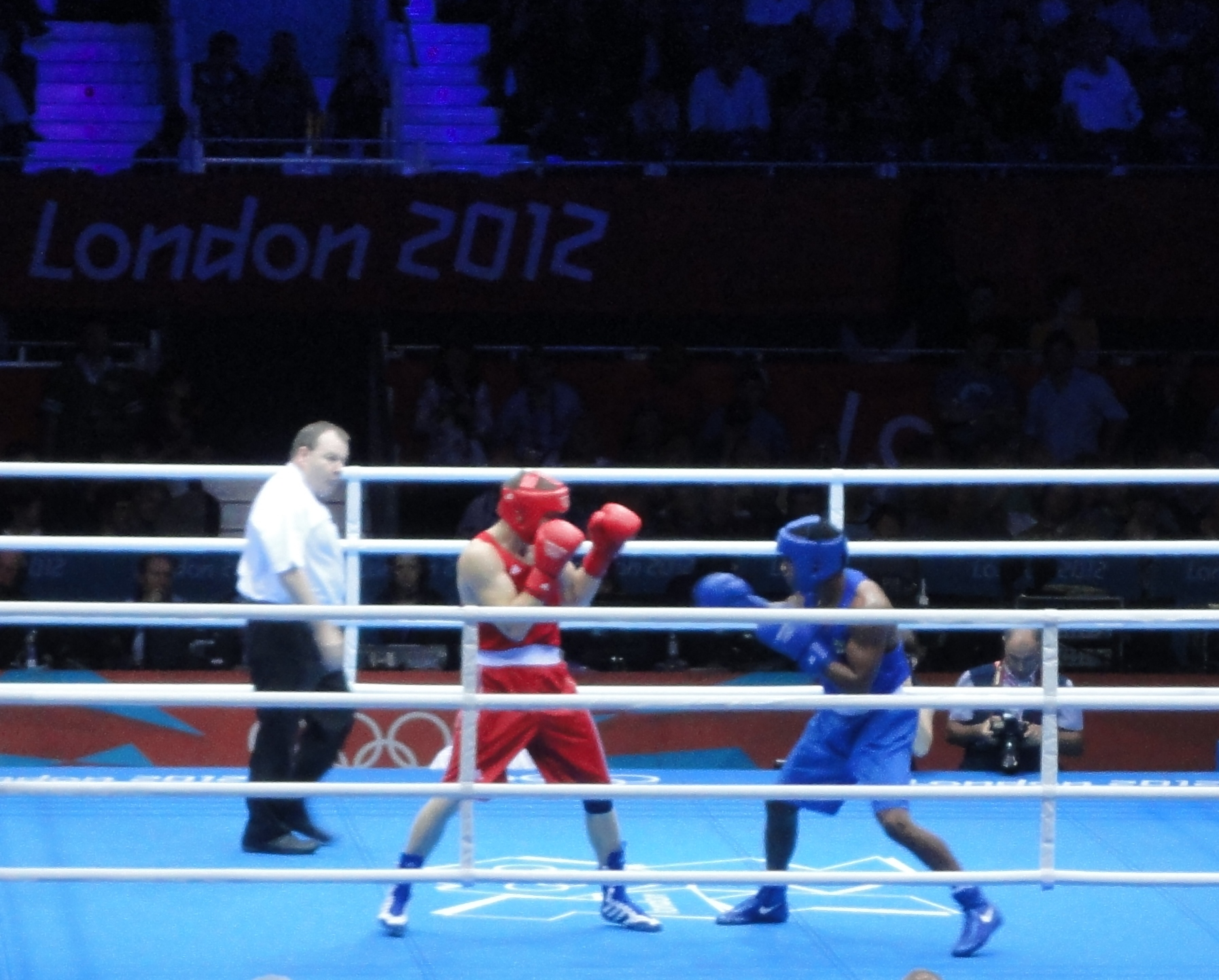
- Soltan Migitinov (AZE, red) and Esquiva Falcão Florentino (BRA, blue) in their men's middleweight round of 16 bout at the 2012 Summer Olympics.

Personal information
- Nationality: Azerbaijan
- Born: September 17, 1988 (age 37) Lipetsk, Russia
- Height: 1.75 m (5 ft 9 in)
- Weight: 75 kg (165 lb)

Boxing career

Soltan Migitinov (17 September 1988, Lipetsk) is an Azerbaijani boxer who competes as a middleweight. At the 2012 Summer Olympics he defeated Egypt's Mohamed Hikal in the first round of the Men's middleweight, before losing to Esquiva Falcão, from Brazil, in the second round.
