= Patrice Volny =

Canadian boxer (born 1994)

Personal information
- Nickname: Vicious
- Born: October 12, 1989 (age 36) Montreal, Quebec, Canada
- Height: 6 ft (183 cm)
- Weight: Middleweight

Boxing career
- Stance: Orthodox

Boxing record
- Total fights: 20
- Wins: 19
- Win by KO: 13
- Losses: 1

Patrice Volny (born October 12, 1989) is a Canadian professional boxer who is the current WBC Francophone middleweight champion.

== Professional career ==
=== Volny vs. Falcao ===
The first big fight of Volny's pro career came against Brazilian Esquiva Falcão in an IBF eliminator. Despite Volny starting to take over in the previous two rounds the fight was brought to halt in the sixth round after Falcao sustained a gruesome gash on his eyebrow. Falcao won a technical decision handing Volny the first loss of his career

=== Volny vs. Butler ===
Volny faced fellow Canadian and former world title challenger Steven Butler. Volny started off poorly, allowing Butler to land punches frequently. As the fight went on, Butler got tired and his punches started to lack power. An accumulation of punches with no response from Butler caused the referee to stop the fight.

=== Volny vs. Williams ===
Volny is set to face American Austin "Ammo" Williams on March 15, 2025 in Orlando. The winner will be the number one contender for the WBA title currently held by Cuban Erislandy Lara.

== Professional boxing record ==
20 fights	19 wins	1 loss
By knockout	13	0
By decision	6	1
No contests	0	

No.	Result	Record	Opponent	Type	Round, time	Date	Location	Notes
20	Win	19–1	Steven Butler	TKO	9 (10), 2:40	6 Jun 2024	Montreal Casino, Montreal, Quebec, Canada	
19	Win	18–1	DeAndre Ware	KO	10 (10), 1:57	2 Feb 2024	Scotiabank Centre, Halifax, Nova Scotia, Canada	
18	Win	17–1	Abraham Juarez Ramirez	TKO	3 (8), 2:18	12 May 2023	Place Bell, Laval, Quebec, Canada	
17	Loss	16–1	Esquiva Falcão	TD	6 (12), 2:18	20 Nov 2021	Mandalay Bay Resort & Casino, Las Vegas, Nevada, U.S.	
16	Win	16–0	Janks Trotter	TKO	5 (8), 1:56	16 Mar 2021	Hotel Plaza Quebec, Quebec City, Quebec, Canada	
15	Win	15–0	Uriel Gonzalez	UD	10	25 Oct 2020	The Danforth Music Hall, Toronto, Ontario, Canada	
14	Win	14–0	Nicolas Holcapfel	RTD	2 (8), 3:00	29 Mar 2019	The Mattamy Events Center, Toronto, Ontario, Canada	
13	Win	13–0	Ryan Young	MD	10	15 Dec 2018	Coca-Cola Coliseum, Toronto, Ontario Canada	
12	Win	12–0	Albert Onolunose	UD	10	29 Sep 2018	Civic Complex, Cornwall, Ontario, Canada	
11	Win	11–0	Janks Trotter	TKO	1 (8), 3:00	19 May 2019	Air Canada Centre, Toronto, Ontario, Canada	
10	Win	10–0	Martin Islas	UD	6	8 Dec 2017	The Danforth Music Hall, Toronto, Ontario, Canada	
9	Win	9–0	Genaro Quiroga	KO	4 (6), 1:01	25 Oct 2017	Lac Leamy Casino, Gatineau, Quebec, Canada	
8	Win	8–0	Adam Green	TKO	5 (8), 1:49	21 Jul 2017	The Danforth Music Hall, Toronto, Ontario, Canada	
7	Win	7–0	Adriel Jusaino Rios	TKO	1 (6), 0:49	15 Jun 2017	Montreal Casino, Montreal, Quebec, Canada	
6	Win	6–0	Alexis Eduardo Olmos	KO	3 (4), 2:23	20 Apr 2017	The Danforth Music Hall, Toronto, Ontario, Canada	
5	Win	5–0	Louisbert Altidor	MD	6	9 Feb 2017	Montreal Casino, Montreal, Quebec, Canada	
4	Win	4–0	Daniel Przewieslik	TK0	3 (4), 1:57	10 Dec 2016	Montreal Casino, Montreal, Quebec, Canada	
3	Win	3–0	Oscar Masso Cando	TKO	4 (4), 3:00	20 Oct 2016	Montreal Casino, Montreal, Quebec, Canada	
2	Win	2–0	Charles Hauver	UD	4	24 May 2016	Montreal Casino, Montreal, Quebec, Canada	
1	Win	1–0	Michel Tsalla	TKO	2 (4), 2:22	17 Mar 2016	Montreal Casino, Montreal, Quebec, Canada	
