= Emilio Correa (boxer born 1985) =

Cuban boxer

Emilio Correa Jr.
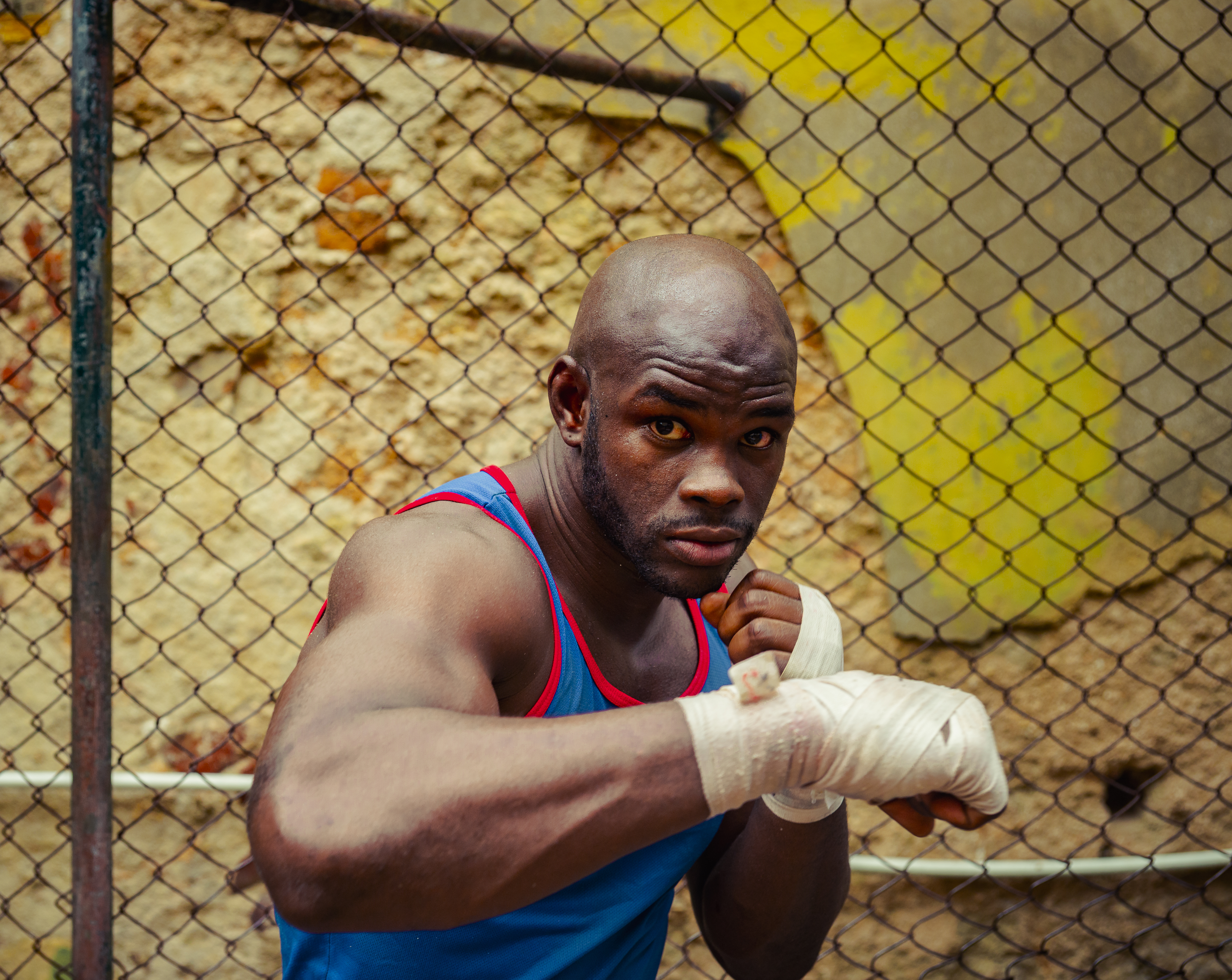

Personal information
- Full name: Emilio Correa Bayeux Júnior
- Born: 12 October 1985 (age 40) Santiago de Cuba

Sport
- Sport: Boxing
Medal record
Men's amateur boxing
Representing Cuba
Olympic Games
Silver medal – second place	2008 Beijing	Middleweight
World Amateur Championships
Bronze medal – third place	2005 Mianyang	Middleweight
Pan American Games
Gold medal – first place	2007 Rio	Middleweight
Gold medal – first place	2011 Guadalajara	Middleweight

Emilio Correa Bayeux Júnior (Note: In this Spanish name, the first or paternal surname is Correa and the second or maternal family name is Bayeux.) (born 12 October 1985) is a Cuban amateur boxer best known for winning the middleweight gold medal at the 2007 Pan American Games. He is the son of Olympic champion Emilio Correa Sr.

== Career ==
In 2004, he lost by stoppage in the welterweight final of the World Junior Championships to Elshod Rasulov and finished third at the national senior championships.

In 2005, he moved up to middleweight and won the national championships. At the World Championships, he won a bronze after losing to Russian star Matvey Korobov.

In 2006, he lost the final of the national championships to veteran Yordanis Despaigne.

At the PanAm Games 2007, he knocked out American Shawn Porter, outpointed Marco Periban 34:10, beat Carlos Góngora 21:13 in the semis and Argenis Nunez 22:5 in the final.

He reached the 2008 Middleweight Olympic final, where he lost a bout for gold against Great Britain's James DeGale. The bout would have gone to countback had he not bitten DeGale, for which he was penalized 2 points.

At the 2011 World Amateur Boxing Championships he was upset by Romanian Bogdan Juratoni.

At the 2012 Olympic qualifier he was disqualified in his first bout and therefore didn't participate in the London games.

=== Olympic results ===
2008

- Defeated Jarrod Fletcher (Australia) 17–4
- Defeated Sergiy Derevyanchenko (Ukraine) 18–4
- Defeated Elshod Rasulov (Uzbekistan) 9–7
- Defeated Vijender Singh (India) 8–5
- Lost to James DeGale 14-16
