= Bogdan Juratoni =

Romanian boxer (born 1990)

Medal record

Representing Romania

Men's Boxing

Cadet European Amateur Boxing Championships
Silver medal – second place	2006 Tirana	-57 kg

Romania National Amateur Boxing Championships
Gold medal – first place	2012 Reșița	-75 kg
Gold medal – first place	2013 Reșița	-75 kg
Gold medal – first place	2014 Piatra Neamț	-75 kg
Gold medal – first place	2015 Târgu Mureș	-75 kg
Gold medal – first place	2016 Brăila	-75 kg
Gold medal – first place	2017 Bucharest	-81 kg

World Amateur Championships
Bronze medal – third place	2011 Baku	Middleweight

European Amateur Championships
Silver medal – second place	2013 Minsk	Middleweight

Bogdan Andrei Juratoni (born June 17, 1990 in Deva) is a Romanian boxer. Juratoni won the bronze medal at the 2011 World Amateur Boxing Championships in Baku and qualified for the 2012 Summer Olympics in London.

== Career ==
Juratoni is former European Cadet finalist.

The 21-year-old Romanian captured the bronze medal in the 2011 World Amateur Boxing Championships from Baku causing two huge surprises. On his way to a medal, he eliminated Cuba's Olympic silver medallist Emilio Correa in a tightly fought contest 26:24 in the third round of the competition and the World Championships silver medallist boxer Andranik Hakobyan of Armenia in the quarterfinals before losing in the semi-final to eventual champion Evhen Khytrov.

At the 2012 Summer Olympics he lost his first bout to Abbos Atoev 10:12.

=== World Champs results ===
2011

- Defeated Matej Dujić (Croatia)) 28-11
- Defeated Tibor Varga (Slovakia) 12-2
- Defeated Emilio Correa (Cuba) 26-24
- Defeated Andranik Hakobyan (Armenia) 21-17
- Lost to Evhen Khytrov RSC
