= 2007 Asian Amateur Boxing Championships =

Boxing competition in Ulaanbaatar, Mongolia

2007 Asian Boxing Championships
- Host city: Ulaanbaatar, Mongolia
- Dates: 4–10 June 2007
- Main venue: Bökhiin Örgöö

The 24th edition of the Men's Asian Amateur Boxing Championships were held from June 4 to June 10, 2007 at Bökhiin Örgöö in Ulaanbaatar, Mongolia. About 140 athletes from 20 countries and regions competed for the 11 champions during seven days.

== Medal summary ==
Event	Gold	Silver	Bronze
Light flyweight 48 kg	Pürevdorjiin Serdamba; Mongolia	Zou Shiming; China	Olimjon Nazarov; Uzbekistan
Light flyweight 48 kg	Pürevdorjiin Serdamba; Mongolia	Zou Shiming; China	Amandeep Singh; India
Flyweight; 51 kg	Mirat Sarsembayev; Kazakhstan	Yang Bo; China	Jitender Kumar; India
Flyweight; 51 kg	Mirat Sarsembayev; Kazakhstan	Yang Bo; China	Anvar Yunusov; Tajikistan
Bantamweight; 54 kg	Enkhbatyn Badar-Uugan; Mongolia	Orzubek Shayimov; Uzbekistan	Kanat Abutalipov; Kazakhstan
Bantamweight; 54 kg	Enkhbatyn Badar-Uugan; Mongolia	Orzubek Shayimov; Uzbekistan	Akhil Kumar; India
Featherweight; 57 kg	Zorigtbaataryn Enkhzorig; Mongolia	Yeldos Saidalin; Kazakhstan	Li Yang; China
Featherweight; 57 kg	Zorigtbaataryn Enkhzorig; Mongolia	Yeldos Saidalin; Kazakhstan	Foroutan Golara; Iran
Lightweight; 60 kg	Kim Song-guk; North Korea	Bekzod Khidirov; Uzbekistan	Kim Young-won; South Korea
Lightweight; 60 kg	Kim Song-guk; North Korea	Bekzod Khidirov; Uzbekistan	Houman Karami; Iran
Light welterweight 64 kg	Serik Sapiyev; Kazakhstan	Byambyn Tüvshinbat; Mongolia	Saeid Norouzi; Iran
Light welterweight 64 kg	Serik Sapiyev; Kazakhstan	Byambyn Tüvshinbat; Mongolia	Manoj Kumar; India
Welterweight; 69 kg	Bakhyt Sarsekbayev; Kazakhstan	Nandin-Erdeniin Möngöntsooj; Mongolia	Dilbag Singh; India
Welterweight; 69 kg	Bakhyt Sarsekbayev; Kazakhstan	Nandin-Erdeniin Möngöntsooj; Mongolia	Hanati Silamu; China
Middleweight; 75 kg	Elshod Rasulov; Uzbekistan	Vijender Singh; India	Mohammad Sattarpour; Iran
Middleweight; 75 kg	Elshod Rasulov; Uzbekistan	Vijender Singh; India	Suriya Prasathinphimai; Thailand
Light heavyweight 81 kg	Abbos Atoev; Uzbekistan	Zhang Xiaoping; China	Ri Jong-bom; North Korea
Light heavyweight 81 kg	Abbos Atoev; Uzbekistan	Zhang Xiaoping; China	Song Hak-sung; South Korea
Heavyweight; 91 kg	Ali Mazaheri; Iran	Soumar Ghossoun; Syria	Jasur Matchanov; Uzbekistan
Heavyweight; 91 kg	Ali Mazaheri; Iran	Soumar Ghossoun; Syria	Khamzat Geliskhanov; Kazakhstan
Super heavyweight +91 kg	Rustam Saidov; Uzbekistan	Zhang Zhilei; China	Ajay Kumar; India
Super heavyweight +91 kg	Rustam Saidov; Uzbekistan	Zhang Zhilei; China	Ahmad Wattar; Syria

== Medal table ==
Rank	Nation	Gold	Silver	Bronze	Total
1	Uzbekistan	3	2	2	7
2	Mongolia	3	2	0	5
3	Kazakhstan	3	1	2	6
4	Iran	1	0	4	5
5	North Korea	1	0	1	2
6	China	0	4	2	6
7	India	0	1	6	7
8	Syria	0	1	1	2
9	South Korea	0	0	2	2
10	Tajikistan	0	0	1	1
10	Thailand	0	0	1	1
Totals (11 entries)		11	11	22	44
