= Esquiva Falcão =

Brazilian boxer (born 1989)

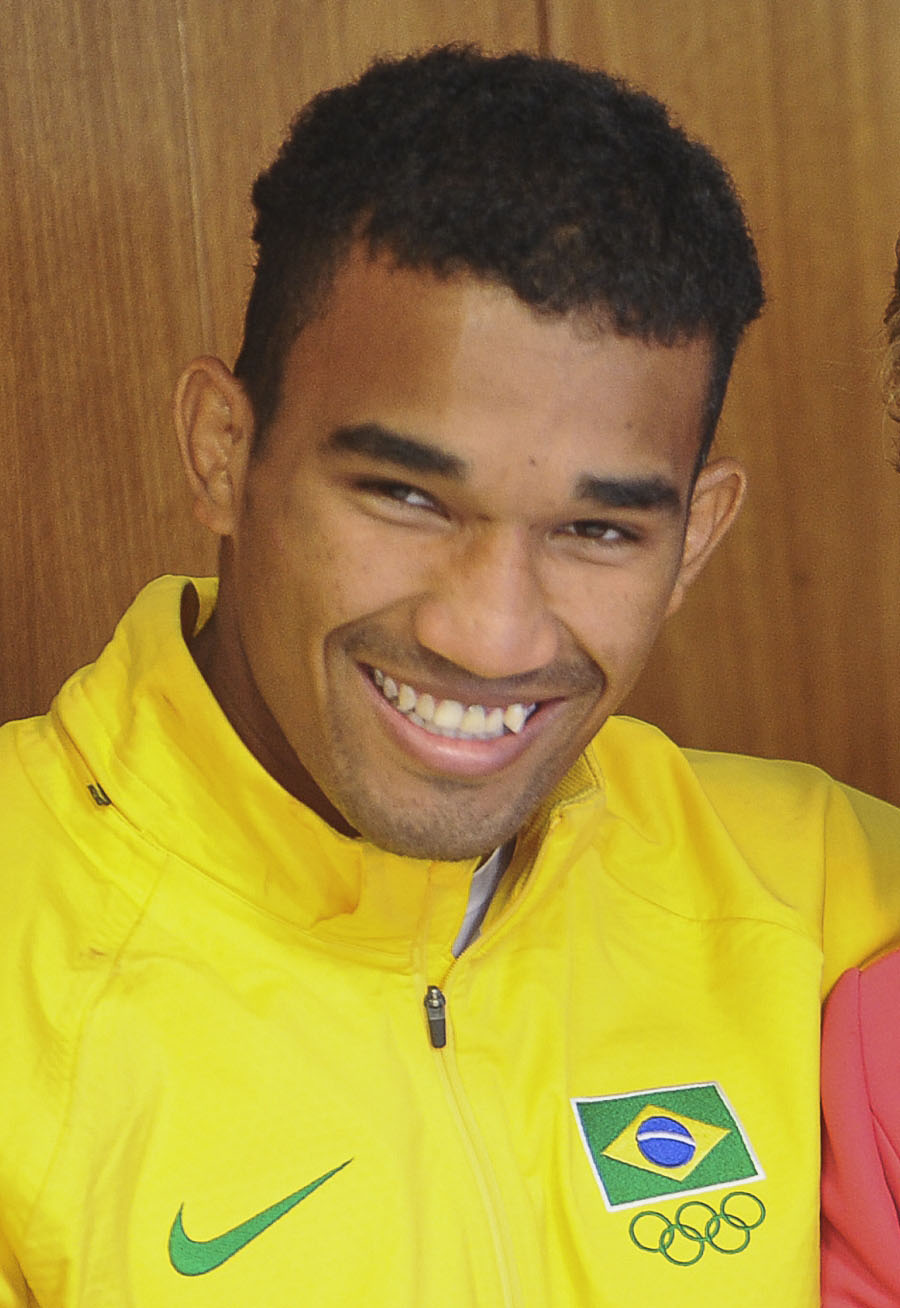

Personal information
- Born: Esquiva Falcão Florentino; 12 December 1989 (age 36) Vitória, Espírito Santo, Brazil
- Height: 5 ft 10 in (178 cm)
- Weight: Middleweight; Super-middleweight; Light-heavyweight

Boxing career
- Reach: 73 1/3 in (186 cm)
- Stance: Southpaw

Boxing record
- Total fights: 35
- Wins: 32
- Win by KO: 21
- Losses: 3
Medal record
Representing Brazil
Olympic Games
Silver medal – second place	2012 London	Middleweight
World Amateur Championships
Bronze medal – third place	2011 Baku	Middleweight
South American Games
Bronze medal – third place	2010 Medellin	Welterweight

Esquiva Falcão Florentino (born 12 December 1989) is a Brazilian professional boxer. As an amateur, he won a bronze medal at the 2011 World Championships and silver at the 2012 Olympics. As a professional boxer, he accumulated a record of 30 straight wins before losing to Vincenzo Gualtieri by a 12-round unanimous decision in a fight for the vacant IBF middleweight title, his first-ever loss.

== Early life ==
Falcão was born in Vitória, Espírito Santo, and is the younger brother of professional boxer Yamaguchi Falcão.

== Amateur career ==
He became famous in his amateur years by winning the Middleweight bronze medal at the 2011 World Amateur Boxing Championships, losing in the semifinals to Ryōta Murata. He thus qualified for the 2012 London Olympics, where he won the silver medal, becoming the first Brazilian to reach an Olympic boxing final after defeating Soltan Migitinov, Zoltán Harcsa and local hero Anthony Ogogo.

His name is Portuguese for "dodge\slip", as his amateur boxer father wanted to circumvent the prohibition given for coach instructions during the fight, and guide his son simply by shouting his name.

He finished his amateur career with a record of 215 wins and 15 losses.

== Professional career ==
Falcão was supposed to fight Paul Harness on his debut, but Harness got injured only six days before the event and was replaced by Joshua Robertson. In his debut fight, he knocked out Joshua Robertson in the fourth round. Falcão's next fight was announced as part of the preliminary card of the Manny Pacquiao and Timothy Bradley rematch event against Publio Pena. He dominated most of the fight and won by unanimous decision over Publio Pena. Two judges scored the fight 60–54, and one scored 60–53. Falcão was supposed to face Australian Alex Don, however, Don got injured and was replaced by South Korean Eun-Chang Lee. Falcão defeated Eun-Chang Lee by unanimous decision, the scorecards were 59–55, 59-54 e 58–55, all in favor of Falcão. The fight took place in Macau, China. Esquiva was expected to face Mexican Mike Noriega, but Mike broke his hand due to sparring. Noriega was replaced by the American Malcolm Terry Jr. and Falcão beat him via TKO in the second round after a second knockdown, the fight was stopped by the referee. The first knockdown came in the first round. After some time boxing, Esquiva Falcão amassed an undefeated record of 27 wins with 19 knockouts, and then faced Russian Artur Akavov, in a fight where he defeated the Russian in the fourth round via retirement, because his opponent likely had a broken nose due to punches landed by Esquiva.

Falcão fought Vincenzo Gualtieri for the vacant IBF middleweight title on 1 July 2023. Originally Falcão was supposed to fight Michael Zerafa for the title vacated by Gennady Golovkin, but Zerafa opted to pursue a World Boxing Association title fight against Erislandy Lara that opened the opportunity for Gualtieri. He lost by unanimous decision to Gualtieri, the first defeat of his career.

On 15 June 2024, Falcão fought Hebert Conceição for the vacant Brazilian super-middleweight title at Komplexo Tempo in São Paulo, losing by unanimous decision.

Moving up in weight divisions, Falcao defeated Carmelito De Jesus via unanimous decision to win the vacant Brazilian light-heavyweight title at Ginásio Estadual do Ibirapuera in São Paulo on 1 November 2025.

Returning to super-middleweight, he challenged NABF champion Wilkens Mathieu at Capitole de Quebec in Quebec City, Canada, on June 11, 2026. Falcão suffered the first stoppage defeat of his career, losing by technical knockout in the eighth round.

== Professional boxing record ==
35 fights	32 wins	3 losses
By knockout	21	1
By decision	11	2

No.	Result	Record	Opponent	Type	Round, time	Date	Location	Notes
35	Loss	32–3	Wilkens Mathieu	TKO	8 (10), 3:00	11 Jun 2026	Capitole de Quebec, Quebec City, Canada	For NABF super-middleweight title
34	Win	32–2	Carmelito De Jesus	UD	10	1 Nov 2025	Ginásio Estadual do Ibirapuera, São Paulo, Brazil	Won vacant Brazilian light-heavyweight title
33	Win	31–2	Marcos Vinicius Rodrigues De Barros	KO	2 (8), 1:44	2 Aug 2025	Tork N' Roll, Curitiba, Brazil	
32	Loss	30–2	Hebert Conceição	UD	10	15 Jun 2024	Komplexo Tempo, São Paulo, Brazil	For vacant Brazilian super-middleweight title
31	Loss	30–1	Vincenzo Gualtieri	UD	12	1 Jul 2023	Uni-Halle, Wuppertal, Germany	For vacant IBF middleweight title
30	Win	30–0	Cristian Fabian Ríos	UD	10	29 May 2022	Arena de Lutas, São Paulo, Brazil	
29	Win	29–0	Patrice Volny	TD	6 (12) 2:18	20 Nov 2021	Michelob Ultra Arena, Paradise, Nevada, U.S.	
28	Win	28–0	Artur Akavov	RTD	4 (10), 3:00	20 Feb 2021	MGM Grand, Las Vegas, Nevada, U.S.	
27	Win	27–0	Morrama Dheisw de Araujo Santos	TKO	1 (10), 2:12	29 Aug 2020	Arena de Lutas, São Paulo, Brazil	
26	Win	26–0	Jorge Daniel Miranda	RTD	5 (10), 3:00	29 Feb 2020	Arena de Lutas, São Paulo, Brazil	
25	Win	25–0	Manny Woods	KO	3 (10), 2:16	9 Nov 2019	Chukchansi Park, Fresno, California, U.S.	
24	Win	24–0	Jesus Antonio Gutierrez	TKO	8 (10), 1:35	19 Jul 2019	MGM National Harbor, Oxon Hill, Maryland, U.S.	
23	Win	23–0	Jorge Daniel Miranda	UD	10	31 Mar 2019	Portobello Resort & Safari, Mangaratiba, Brazil	
22	Win	22–0	Guido Nicolas Pitto	UD	10	20 Oct 2018	Park MGM, Paradise, Nevada, U.S.	
21	Win	21–0	Jonathan Tavira	KO	1 (10), 1:38	28 Jul 2018	Kissimmee Civic Center, Kissimmee, Florida, U.S.	
20	Win	20–0	Salim Larbi	KO	1 (10), 2:06	10 Mar 2018	StubHub Center, Carson, California, U.S.	
19	Win	19–0	José Miguel Fandino	TKO	7 (8), 2:43	3 Nov 2017	Osceola Heritage Center, Kissimmee, Florida, U.S.	
18	Win	18–0	Norberto González	UD	8	5 Aug 2017	Microsoft Theater, Los Angeles, California, U.S.	
17	Win	17–0	Jaime Barboza	UD	8	17 Feb 2017	Don Haskins Convention Center, El Paso, Texas, U.S.	
16	Win	16–0	Luis Hernandez	UD	8	2 Dec 2016	Save Mart Center, Fresno, California, U.S.	
15	Win	15–0	Josué Obando	RTD	6 (8), 3:00	28 Oct 2016	Laredo Energy Arena, Laredo, Texas, U.S.	
14	Win	14–0	Paul Valenzuela Jr.	TKO	4 (8), 1:31	14 May 2016	Sportsmen's Lodge, Los Angeles, California, U.S.	
13	Win	13–0	Joe McCreedy	TKO	5 (8), 1:48	19 Mar 2016	Arena Theatre, Houston, Texas, U.S.	
12	Win	12–0	Hector Muñoz	TKO	4 (8), 2:26	12 Dec 2015	Tucson Convention Center, Tucson, Arizona, U.S.	
11	Win	11–0	Zoltan Papp	KO	2 (8), 1:50	26 Sep 2015	Tachi Palace Hotel & Casino, Lemoore, California, U.S.	
10	Win	10–0	Aaron Drake	TKO	4 (8), 0:45	26 Jun 2015	State Farm Arena, Hidalgo, Texas, U.S.	
9	Win	9–0	Paul Harness	RTD	3 (8), 3:00	8 May 2015	Prudential Center, Newark, New Jersey, U.S.	
8	Win	8–0	Omar Rojas	UD	6	11 Apr 2015	Laredo Energy Arena, Laredo, Texas, U.S.	
7	Win	7–0	Mike Tufariello	TKO	2 (6), 2:22	28 Feb 2015	USF Sun Dome, Tampa, Florida, U.S.	
6	Win	6–0	Lanny Dardar	TKO	5 (6), 1:31	6 Dec 2014	Civic Auditorium, Glendale, California, U.S.	
5	Win	5–0	Austin Marcum	TKO	2 (6), 1:24	4 Oct 2014	Bahia Shrine Temple, Orlando, Florida, U.S.	
4	Win	4–0	Malcolm Terry Jr.	KO	2 (6), 0:43	9 Aug 2014	Civic Auditorium, Glendale, California, U.S.	
3	Win	3–0	Lee Eun-chang	UD	6	31 May 2014	CotaiArena, Macau, SAR	
2	Win	2–0	Publio Pena	UD	6	12 Apr 2014	MGM Grand, Las Vegas, Nevada, U.S.	
1	Win	1–0	Joshua Robertson	TKO	4 (6), 2:36	15 Feb 2014	C. Robert Lee Center, Hawaiian Gardens, California, U.S.	
