= Mohamed Hikal =

Egyptian boxer (born 1979)

Personal information
- Full name: Mohamed Abdel Mawgoud Hikal
- Nationality: Egypt
- Born: 10 January 1979 (age 47) Gharbiya -zefta, dahtora-elassasy street
- Height: 1.75 m (5 ft 9 in)
- Weight: 71 kg (157 lb)

Sport
- Sport: Boxing
- Weight class: Middleweight
Medal record
World Amateur Championships
Bronze medal – third place	2005 Mianyang	Middleweight
All-Africa Games
Gold medal – first place	1999 Johannesburg	Light Middleweight
Gold medal – first place	2003 Abuja	Welterweight
Mediterranean Games
Gold medal – first place	2005 Almeíra	Middleweight

Mohamed Hikal (born 10 January 1979) is an Egyptian boxer. He won the bronze medal in the men's middleweight division (75 kg) at the 2005 World Amateur Boxing Championships. He competed in four Olympic Games from 2000 to 2012.

== Career ==
Hikal won the gold medal in the welterweight division at the 2003 All-Africa Games in Abuja, Nigeria.

He also participated in the 2004 Summer Olympics, where he was defeated in the second round of the welterweight (69 kg) division by Russia's eventual bronze medalist Oleg Saitov.

Hikal subsequently moved up to middleweight, and later managed to upset defending world champion Gennady Golovkin and win the bronze medal in the middleweight (75 kg) division at the 2005 World Amateur Boxing Championships.

At the 2008 Olympics, he lost his first bout to Britain's James DeGale. At the 2012 Olympics also he lost in the first round, to Soltan Migitinov of Azerbaijan.
