= Adem Kılıçcı =

Turkish boxer (born 1986)

Personal information
- Full name: Adem Kılıçcı
- Born: March 5, 1986 (age 40) Ağrı, Turkey
- Height: 1.85 m (6 ft 1 in)
- Weight: 69 kg (152 lb)

Sport
- Country: Turkey
- Sport: Boxing
- Weight class: Welterweight, middleweight
- Club: Fenerbahçe Boxing
Medal record
World Amateur Championships
Bronze medal – third place	2007 Chicago	Welterweight
European Amateur Championships
Silver medal – second place	2011 Ankara	Middleweight
Mediterranean Games
Gold medal – first place	2013 Mersin	Middleweight
Silver medal – second place	2009 Pescara	Middleweight
World University Championships
Silver medal – second place	2004 Antalya	Welterweight

Adem Kılıçcı (pronounced [ˈadem ˈkɯlɯtʃˈtʃɯ]; born March 5, 1986) is a Turkish professional boxer in the middleweight division. At 1.85 m (6.1 ft), he weighs 75 kg (165 lb). He is currently a member of the Fenerbahçe Boxing Club in Istanbul. On 1 February 2017, the IOC disqualified Kılıççı from the 2012 Olympic Games due to an adverse test for turinabol, a finding from the IOC's 2016 wave of retesting of samples from previous Games. Kılıççı had ranked 5th in men's 69–75 kg boxing.

== Welterweight ==
Kılıççı won a silver medal at the 2004 World University Boxing Championship in Antalya, Turkey.

Kılıççı participated at the 2007 World Amateur Boxing Championships held in Chicago, USA and won the bronze medal at welterweight.

At the 2008 Olympics he was defeated in the first round by British boxer Billy Joe Saunders 3:14 and decided to move up to middleweight.

== Middleweight ==
In 2009, Kılıcı gained the silver medal at the Mediterranean Games in Pescara, Italy losing to Rachid Hamani in the final.

He won the silver medal at the 2011 European Amateur Championships held in Ankara, Turkey, losing to Maxim Koptyakov of Russia.

At the 2012 Olympics he defeated Nursahat Pazziyev of Turkmenistan and Aleksandar Drenovak of Serbia before losing 13:17 to Japan's Ryōta Murata. But he tested positive for steroid turinabol after re-analysis of his samples, and was disqualified. He won a gold medal at the 2013 Mediterranean Games in Mersin, Turkey.

=== Competitions ===
Year	Competition	Results
2017	Survivor Ünlüler-Volunteers	2nd
2018	Survivor 2018: Ünlüler-Volunteers Allstar	Won
2022	Survivor All Star	2nd
2025	Survivor 2025: Ünlüler-Volunteers Allstar	Won
