= Evhen Khytrov =

Ukrainian boxer (born 1988)

Personal information
- Full name: Evhen Khytrov; Євген Хитров
- Nationality: Ukraine
- Born: August 18, 1988 (age 38) Kryvyi Rih, Ukrainian SSR, Soviet Union
- Height: 1.80 m (5 ft 11 in)
- Weight: 75 kg (165 lb)

Sport
- Sport: Boxing
- Weight class: Middleweight
- Coached by: Gary Stark Sr
Medal record
World Amateur Championships
Gold medal – first place	2011 Baku	Middleweight
European Amateur Championships
Bronze medal – third place	2013 Minsk	Middleweight

Evhen Khytrov (Ukrainian: Євген Ігорович Хитров; born 18 August 1988) is a Ukrainian professional boxer. Khytrov won the gold medal at Middleweight division at the 2011 World Amateur Boxing Championships in Baku.

Khytrov was also 2011 Ukrainian Nationals champion, and a former Boxing European Cup and European Juniors Boxing Championships winner. He competed at the 2012 Summer Olympics.

== Career highlights ==
2011 World Championships
Event	Round	Result	Opponent	Score
Middleweight	First	Win	(Turkmenistan) Nursahat Pazzyyev	RSC
Middleweight	Second	Win	(Lithuania) Vladimir Milevskij	21-13
Middleweight	Third	Win	(Hungary) Zoltán Harcsa	RSC
Middleweight	Quarterfinal	Win	(Serbia) Aleksandar Drenovak	34-15
Middleweight	Semifinal	Win	(Romania) Bogdan Juratoni	RSC
Middleweight	Final	Win	(Japan) Ryota Murata	24-22

== Professional career ==
=== Khytrov vs. Aleem ===
On January 14, 2018, Khytrov fought Immanuwel Aleem for the vacant WBC Silver middlweight title. Aleem defeated Khytrov in the sixth round via TKO.

== Professional boxing record ==
20 wins (17 knockouts), 2 losses, 0 draws
Res.	Record	Opponent	Type	Round	Date	Location	Notes
Win	20–2	(Ghana) Ernest Amuzu	TKO	3 (8)	2019-11-23	(United States) Bryan Glazer Family JCC Auditorium, Tampa, Florida, USA	
Win	19–2	(United States) Gabriel Pham	TKO	6 (8)	2019-08-01	(United States) Convention Center, Monroeville, Pennsylvania, USA	
Win	18–2	(United States) Malcom McAllister	KO	4 (6)	2018-11-09	(United States) Forum, Inglewood, California, USA	
Loss	17–2	(United States) Brandon Adams	UD	5	2018-05-16	(United States) LADC Studios, Los Angeles, California, USA	
Win	17–1	(United States) Morgan Fitch	KO	3 (5)	2018-05-10	(United States) LADC Studios, Los Angeles, California, USA	
Win	16–1	(Dominican Republic) Jonathan Batista	KO	1 (8)	2017-12-09	(United States) Masonic Temple, Norfolk, Virginia, USA	
Win	15–1	(United States) Derrick Findley	UD	8	2017-09-15	(United States) Foxwoods Resort Casino, Ledyard, Connecticut, USA	
Lose	14–1	(United States) Immanuwel Aleem	TKO	6 (10)	2017-01-14	(United States) Barclays Center, Brooklyn, New York, USA	For vacant WBC Silver middleweight title
Win	14–0	(United States) Paul Mendez	TKO	9 (10)	2016-07-21	(United States) Foxwoods Resort, Mashantucket, Connecticut, USA	
Win	13–0	(United States) Kenneth McNeil	UD	10	2016-03-05	Sands Bethlehem Event Center, Bethlehem, Pennsylvania, United States	Retained NABF middleweight title
Win	12–0	(United States) Josh Lutheran	KO	2 (10)	2015-10-31	Circus, Kryvyi Rih, Ukraine	Won vacant WBC-NABF middleweight title
Win	11–0	(United States) Nick Brinson	TKO	8 (8)	2015-08-07	Bally's Atlantic City, Atlantic City, New Jersey, United States	
Win	10–0	(United States) Aaron Coley	UD	8	2015-04-10	Aviator Sports Complex, Brooklyn, New York, United States	
Win	9–0	(Puerto Rico) Jorge Meléndez	TKO	8 (10)	2015-03-06	MGM Grand, Marquee Ballroom, Las Vegas, NV, United States	
Win	8–0	(United States) Maurice Louishome	TKO	3 (8)	2015-01-09	Morongo Casino Resort & Spa, Cabazon, California, United States	
Win	7–0	(United States) Louis Rose	KO	1 (8)	2014-11-21	Hard Rock Hotel & Casino, Tulsa, Oklahoma, United States	
Win	6–0	(United States) Willie Fortune	TKO	1 (8)	2014-08-08	CONSOL Energy Center, Pittsburgh, Pennsylvania, United States	
Win	5–0	(United States) Chris Chatman	TKO	3 (6)	2014-06-06	Turning Stone Resort & Casino, Verona, New York, United States	
Win	4–0	(United States) Jas Phipps	TKO	2 (6)	2014-04-10	BB King Blues Club & Grill, New York, New York, United States	
Win	3–0	(United States) Julius Kennedy	TKO	5 (6)	2014-02-21	Shipley Arena, Westminster, Maryland, United States	
Win	2–0	(United States) Romon Barber	TKO	3 (6)	2014-01-31	Harrah's, Chester, Pennsylvania, United States	
Win	1–0	(United States) Christian Nava	TKO	1 (8)	2013-12-18	Webster Hall, New York City, United States	

Notable case

Yevhen Khytrov is a Ukrainian former Olympic boxer and head of the local boxing federation in Kryvyi Rih. In April 2025, he was arrested along with an accomplice for a series of thefts from farm warehouses in Dnipropetrovsk and neighboring regions. Khytrov was charged and convicted with grand theft under martial law conditions. After compensating victims and paying court costs, Khytrov was given 2 years probation.
