= Vijender Singh =

Indian boxer (born 1985)

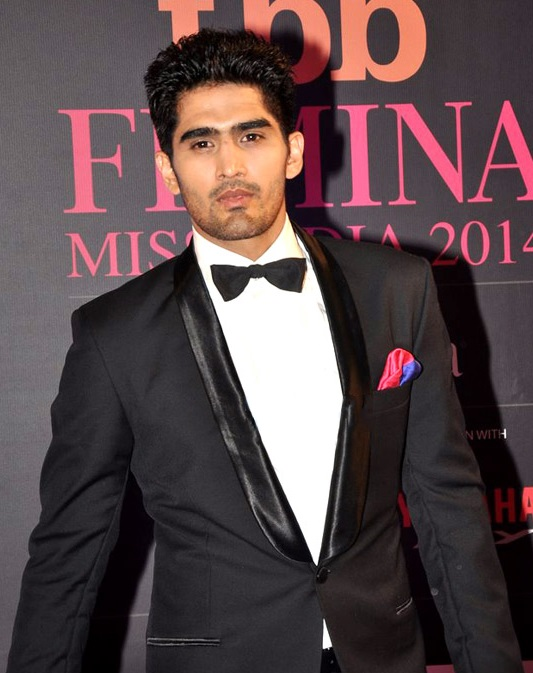
- Singh at the Femina Miss India 2014

Personal information
- Nickname: Singh
- Nationality: Indian
- Born: Vijender Singh Beniwal; 29 October 1985 (age 40) Kaluwas, Haryana, India
- Height: 6 ft 0 in (183 cm)
- Weight: Super-middleweight

Boxing career
- Reach: 76 in (193 cm)
- Stance: Orthodox

Boxing record
- Total fights: 14
- Wins: 13
- Win by KO: 9
- Losses: 1
Medal record
Men's amateur boxing
Representing India
Olympic Games
Bronze medal – third place	2008 Beijing	Middleweight
World Championships
Bronze medal – third place	2009 Milan	Middleweight
Commonwealth Games
Silver medal – second place	2006 Melbourne	Welterweight
Silver medal – second place	2014 Glasgow	Middleweight
Bronze medal – third place	2010 Delhi	Middleweight
Asian Games
Gold medal – first place	2010 Guangzhou	Middleweight
Bronze medal – third place	2006 Doha	Middleweight
Asian Championships
Silver medal – second place	2007 Ulaanbaatar	Middleweight
Bronze medal – third place	2009 Zhuhai	Middleweight

Vijender Singh Beniwal (born 29 October 1985) is an Indian professional boxer and politician of Bharatiya Janata Party. As an amateur, he won a bronze medal at the 2008 Beijing Olympics, becoming the first Indian boxer to win an Olympic medal. He also won bronze medals at the 2009 World Championships and the 2010 Commonwealth Games, as well as silver medals at the 2006 and 2014 Commonwealth Games, all in the middleweight division.

In June 2015, Vijender Singh turned professional and signed a multi-year agreement with Queensberry Promotions through IOS Sports and Entertainment. This ruled him out of 2016 Olympics which would have been his fourth.

He has also been an active politician and contested the 2019 Lok Sabha elections from the South Delhi constituency.

In January 2026, the Boxing Federation of India (BFI) announced he was appointed as a member of the Asian Boxing Council.

== Early life ==
Vijender Singh was born in a Jat family on 29 October 1985 in Kaluwas village, 5 kilometres (3.1 mi) from Bhiwani, Haryana. His father, Mahipal Singh Beniwal, was a bus driver with the Haryana Roadways, while his mother is a homemaker. His father drove extra hours for overtime pay, for Vijender and his elder brother Manoj's education. Vijender did his primary schooling in Kaluwas, secondary schooling in Bhiwani, finally receiving a bachelor's degree from Vaish College, Bhiwani. He married Archana Singh in 2011. They have two sons together, Abir Singh and Amrik Singh.

In order to ensure a better life for their poor family, Vijender decided to learn boxing. Vijender was inspired by his elder brother Manoj, a former boxer himself, to join the sport of boxing. After Manoj succeeded in entering the Indian Army in 1998 with his boxing credentials, he decided to support Vijender financially so he could continue his boxing training. Vijender's parents decided to not pressurise him to continue his studies, as they felt that he had a talent and passion for boxing. For Vijender, boxing quickly grew from an interest and passion to a career choice. Alongside boxing and working part-time, he tried his hand at modelling to financially support his training.

Singh cites the likes of boxers Mike Tyson and Muhammad Ali, boxing promoter Don King, and the character Rocky Balboa from the Rocky film series among his influences.

== Amateur boxing career ==
=== Getting started ===
He trained at the Bhiwani Boxing Club, where former national-level boxer and trainerJagdish Singh recognised his talent. The first recognition for Vijender came when he won a bout in the state level competition. Vijender won a silver medal in his first sub-junior nationals in 1997 and went on to bag his first gold medal at the 2000 Nationals. In 2003, he became the all-India youth boxing champion. The turning point, however, came in the 2003 Afro-Asian Games. Despite being a junior boxer, Vijender took part in the selection trials and was picked for the meet where he fought valiantly to win a silver medal. Singh cites the likes boxers Mike Tyson and Muhammad Ali, boxing promoter Don King, and Rocky character Rocky Balbao among his influences.

=== 2004–07: The Athens Olympics and The Commonwealth Games ===
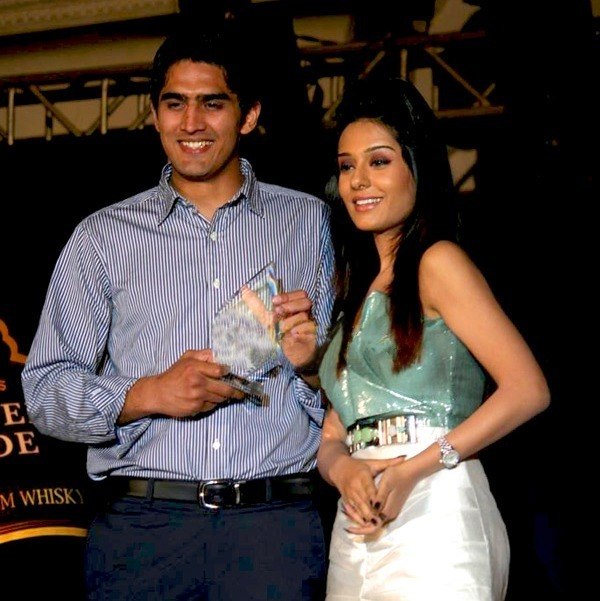
Vijender with actress Amrita Rao during a ramp walk on a modelling show.

Vijender competed at the 2004 Athens Summer Olympics, in the welterweight division, but lost to Mustafa Karagollu of Turkey by a score of 20–25. At the 2006 Commonwealth Games, he defeated England's Neil Perkins in the semifinal but lost to South Africa's Bongani Mwelase in the final, thus leaving with a silver medal. He decided to move up in weight and Vijender took part in the middleweight (75 kg) division at the 2006 Asian Games in Doha, where he won the bronze medal in a lost semifinal bout against Kazakhstan's Bakhtiyar Artayev with the final score of 24–29. Initially Vijender was not supposed to compete because of a back injury, but he recovered in time to win the tournament and qualify for the 2008 Beijing Olympics.

Among his preparations for the 2008 Beijing Olympics was a period spent early in that year when he trained with German boxers in their own country. This training incorporated a tournament involving boxers from around Europe, in one event of which Singh won gold having beaten a German in the process. At The President's Cup boxing tournament, which is touted as a dress rehearsal for the Olympic games, Vijender defeated Artayev in a quarterfinal bout. Speaking after this, Vijender sounded confident of his physical shape. Talking about his preparation for the Beijing Olympics, Vijender said:

"I did not do well the last time because then I was young and did not have the experience. I have just made it to the senior level and qualified for the Olympics. Now I have the experience. I have won medals at major tournaments like the Asian Games and Commonwealth Games. Recently, I also beat the 2004 Olympic Games gold medallist [Bakhtiyar] Artayev [in the AIBA President's Cup], so I have done quite well at the international level. So, definitely, everyone can expect a good showing from me in Beijing."
"Now I have quite a lot of experience after competing at the international level regularly. I just want to say that Indian boxers are no longer a weak lot; all are doing well at the international level. Our boxing graph is going up all the time and the rest of the world is now scared to face Indian boxers."

=== 2008–09: The Beijing Olympics and AIBA top rank ===
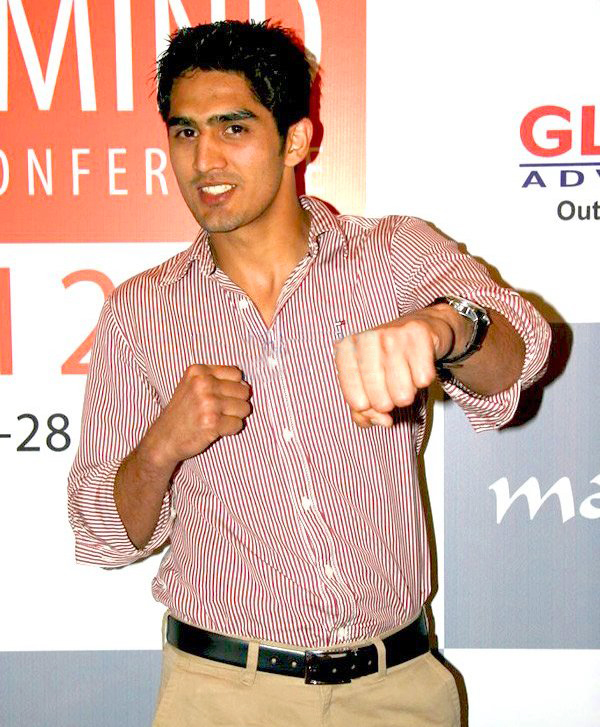
Vijender at the opening of a gymnasium in Mumbai.

After the wins in Germany, Vijender's training for the Olympics continued in Patiala where Indian boxers going to the Olympics held a camp. Vijender was accompanied by boxers Dinesh Kumar, Akhil Kumar, Jitender Kumar and Antharish Lakra. The Indian Amateur Boxing Federation (IABF) sent a videographer to shoot extensively the bouts involving the likely opponents of the five Indian boxers. A team of coaches went through the video footage shot by videographer Sambhu of the National Institute of Sports, Patiala, and studied the technique of the boxers from various countries in detail, so as to prepare Vijender and the others regarding the opponent's manoeuvres and fighting techniques.

At the 2008 Summer Olympics, he defeated Badou Jack of The Gambia 13–2 in the round of 32. In the round of 16, he defeated Angkhan Chomphuphuang of Thailand 13–3 to reach the Middleweight Boxing Quarterfinals. He beat southpaw Carlos Góngora of Ecuador 9–4 in the quarterfinals on 20 August 2008 which guaranteed him a medal, the first ever Olympic medal for an Indian boxer. He lost 5–8 to Cuba's Emilio Correa in the semi-finals on 22 August 2008 and shared a bronze medal. Vijender and wrestler Sushil Kumar—who won a bronze at the men's wrestling competitions—were welcomed grandly to India after their victory.

In July 2009, Vijender accompanied by Sushil and boxer Mary Kom were garlanded with the Major Dhyan Chand Khel Ratna award—India's highest sporting honour. It was the first time that three sportspeople were picked for the award; the award selection committee decided to grant the award to all of them, taking into consideration their performance for the cycle of 2008–09. Kom and Vijender were the first boxers to get the award which carried prize money of Rs 750,000 and a citation. Both Sushil and Vijender were recommended to the Padma Shri awards committee, by the Indian Sports and Home Ministries; however, they were denied the awards after recommendations were not fruitful by the Padma Awards Committee for 2009 winners. The denial of Padma Shri for them created a furore among masses with allegations of promoting only a few sports. Vijender later took up a job with the Haryana Police department which paid him Rs 14,000 per month.

Vijender participated at the 2009 World Amateur Boxing Championships. He was beaten by Abbos Atoev of Uzbekistan in the semi-final of the 75 kg Middleweight category, by 7 points to 3 and was thus awarded the bronze medal. Vijender won the first round of the bout 1–0, only for Atoev to run rampant in the second, landing five unanswered blows. The third round was evenly contested with both fighters scoring on a couple of occasions, but Vijender had already lost the match. In September 2009, the International Boxing Association (AIBA) announced Vijender as the top-ranked boxer in its annual middle-weight (75 kg) category list. He topped the list with 2800 points.

=== 2010–14: Padma Shri, Commonwealth Games and Asian Games ===
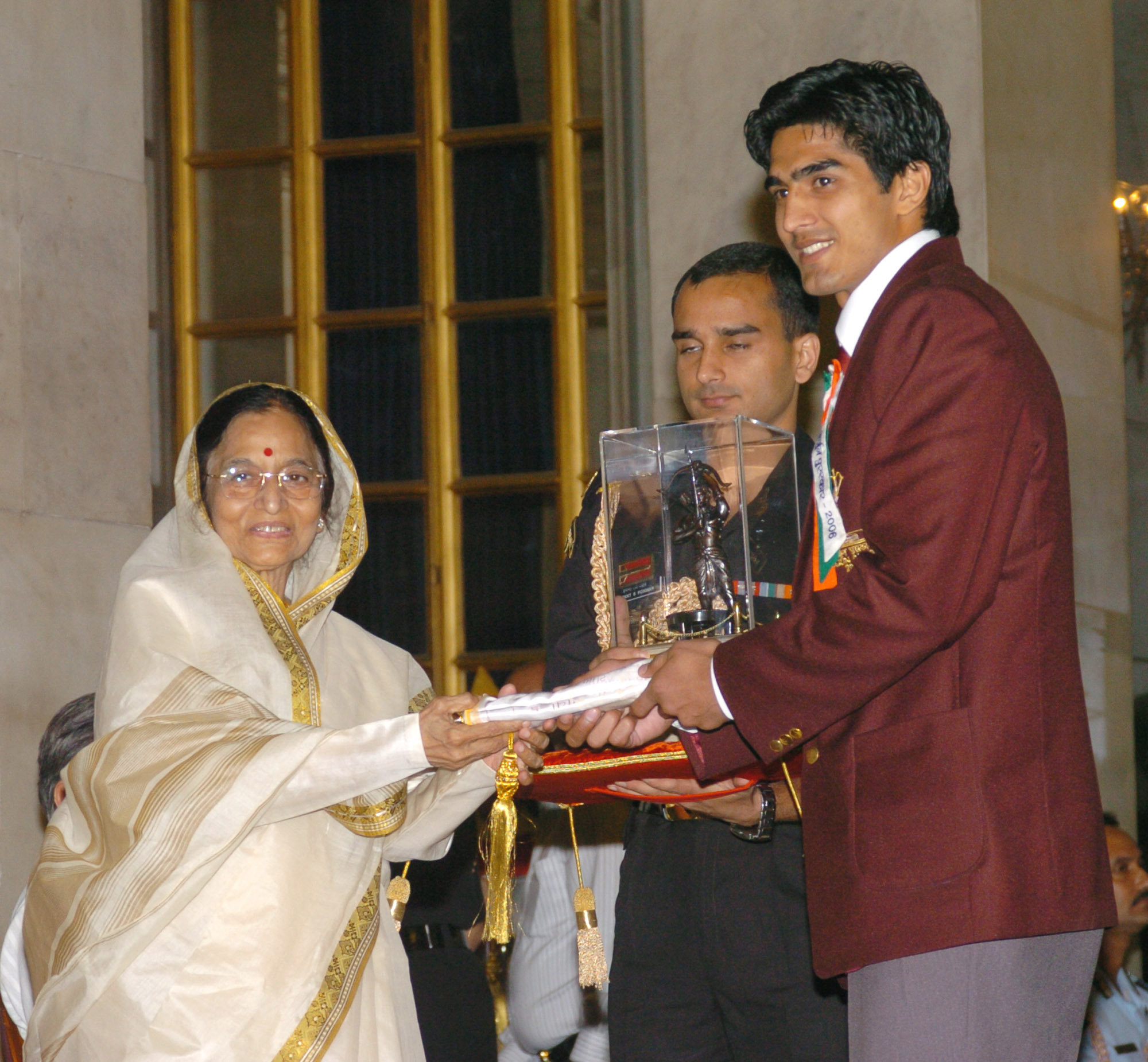
The President, Pratibha Patil presenting the Arjuna Award to Vijender Singh in 2006

In January 2010, Vijender was awarded the Padma Shri for outstanding contribution to Indian sports. Later, he participated in the invitational Champions of Champions boxing tournament in China, and won a silver medal, losing 0–6 to Zhang Jin Ting in the 75 kg middleweight final. At the 2010 Commonwealth Boxing Championship held in New Delhi 18 March 2010, he along with five other fellow Indians won gold medal. Vijender defeated England's Frank Buglioni 13–3.

At the 2010 Commonwealth Games, Vijender Singh was beaten by England's Anthony Ogogo in the semi-finals. Leading 3–0 on points going into the final round, Singh was twice given a two-point penalty by Canadian referee Michael Summers, the second for coming just 20 seconds before the end of the bout, leading Ogogo to win by 4 points to 3. The Indian Boxing Federation (IBF) launched an unsuccessful appeal, leaving Singh with a bronze medal. IBF Secretary General P K Muralidharan Raja said, "The jury reviewed the bout and came to the conclusion that Vijender was holding his opponent and the referee was right in warning him. When the Indian team pointed out that even Ogogo was holding Vijender, the jury felt it was not the case." Singh lashed out saying that the penalties were "harsh and unfair. The warnings were unfair and harsh. If the referee thought I was holding Ogogo then he should have penalised this guy as well. He was also holding me. It's a joke that somebody has won by scoring points just out of warnings." One month later, in November, he won the 2010 Asian Games shutting out Uzbek two time world champion Abbos Atoev 7:0 in the final.

At the 2012 Summer Olympics, he beat Danabek Suzhanov of Kazakhstan 14–10 in the first round of men's middle-weight 75 kg category Boxing event, to advance to the round of 16 of the games. He then edged out American Terrell Gausha 16–15 to win the pre-quarter finals bout. He lost to Abbos Atoev of Uzbekistan in quarter final with a score of 13–17.

In the 2014 Commonwealth Games, Singh claimed the silver medal after being defeated in the final by England's Antony Fowler by 1:2 decision.

== Professional career ==
=== Early fights ===
Singh turned professional as he signed a multi-year agreement with Frank Warren's Queensberry Promotions through IOS Sports and Entertainment. On 10 October 2015 Singh fought his first professional boxing match. He defeated his opponent Sonny Whiting by TKO. On 7 November, Singh knocked British boxer Dean Gillen in round 1 at the National Stadium in Dublin. In his third pro fight, Singh fought on the undercard of Lee-Saunders on 19 December. Singh defeated Bulgarian Samet Hyuseinov via technical knockout. On 21 March 2016 Singh knocked out Hungary's Alexander Horvath in round 3 on the Flanagan-Matthews undercard. Singh defeated French boxer Matiouze Royer at the Copper Box Arena on 30 April via 5th-round TKO. The fight was halted due to Royer suffering a cut above his left eye. On 13 May, Singh fought at Bolton's Macron Stadium against Polish Andrej Soldra. Singh won via 3rd-round TKO, knocking down Soldra in round 5 to mark his 6th professional win in a row, all coming by way of knockout.

On 7 July 2016 Singh defeated Australian Kerry Hope for the vacant WBO Asia Pacific Super Middleweight title on his home soil in India, marking his seventh consecutive win, this time by unanimous decision, thus ending his 6 fight knockout streak. Two judges scored it 98–92, while the third judge had it 100–90. With winning the WBO Asia Pacific title, on 3 August, WBO announced Singh moved up to number 10th spot in the rankings.

Singh successfully defended his title in an impressive technical knockout win over Cheka in the 3rd round. According to Frank Warren, the fight garnered an average 60 million viewers and had an attendance of 15,000 at the Thyagaraj Sports Complex. Following the fight, Singh stated he could challenge for the Commonwealth or Oriental title in 2017, whether that be in the UK or in India.

In an official statement by Team Singh on 12 May, it was confirmed that Singh had parted ways with Frank Warren's Queensberry Promotions with immediate effect, whilst remaining with IOS Boxing Promotions. The reason behind this was "Queensberry not honoring and delivering their contractual obligations for more than a year".

In June 2017, the WBO confirmed that they would sanction a regional unification fight between Singh and WBO Oriental super middleweight champion Zulpikar Maimaitiali of China. The New Indian Express announced the fight, billed as "Battleground Asia" would take place on 5 August 2017 at the Sardar Vallabhbhai Patel Indoor Stadium in Mumbai. On 26 July, IOS Boxing Promotions and Frank Warren's Queensberry Promotions announced that they had reached a deal to work together once again. Singh retained his Asia Pacific title and won the Oriential title after the fight went to the scorecards after 10 rounds. The judges scored the fight 96–93, 95–94, 95–94 in favour of Singh. Although the fight was scored close, Singh seemed to have the fight under control using his height and reach. In round six, Maimaitiali was docked a point for repeated low blows after being warned in previous rounds. Had he not been docked a point, the fight would have ended as a majority draw. After the bout, Singh praised his opponent, "I didn't expect him to fight so well and last the distance. I thought this would last for a maximum of 5-6 rounds. Hence I didn't fight according to my strategies. I just want to tell China, please don't come to our border. This is for peace." He said about the bout, "The blows disturbed me. He has been fantastic. His aggression was terrific." He also offered the title back to Maimaitiali, as a message for peace. This was in relation to the recent border tension between India and China.

On 16 November 2017, the Commonwealth Boxing Council ordered Rocky Fielding to defend his super middleweight title against Singh. Frank Warren won the bid and stated the fight would take place on 31 March 2018 at the CopperBox Arena in London.

On 4 December 2017, upon announcing Vijender Singh Promotions, Singh announced that he would next fight on 23 December against Ghanaian boxer Ernest Amuzu (23–2, 21 KOs) in Jaipur. Singh retained his regional titles with a dominant 10-round decision win. All three judges scored the fight 100–90 in favour of Singh, who improved to 10 wins and no losses.

=== Signing with Top Rank ===
Having not fought in 2018 and struggling to land a title fight, on 20 November 2018, Singh signed a multiyear promotional contract with American-based boxing promotional company, Top Rank.

== Public image ==
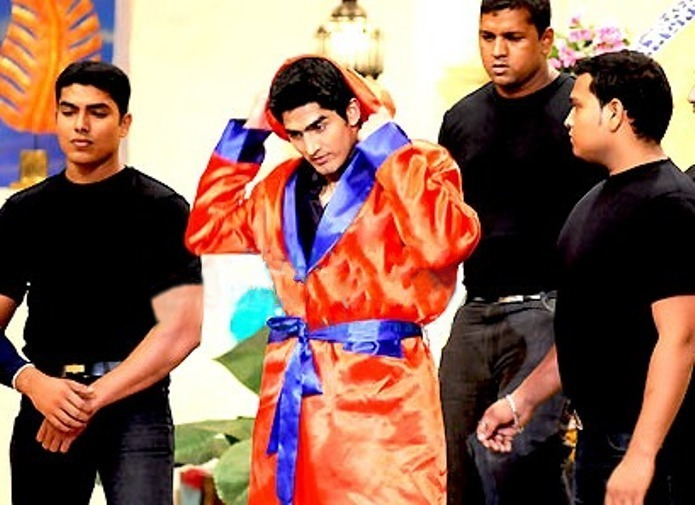
Vijender preparing for a boxing match on a television show.

After his 2008 Olympic win, Vijender emerged into mainstream media prominence in India and became the latest pin-up boy. Apart from boxing, Vijender took part in ramp shows also. However he commented that with partaking modelling, he wished to "bring the game [boxing] in the limelight, make it as popular as possible and catapult it to its deserving place at the top." He has regularly spoken against the bias that Indian media has promoted only cricket as the sole game in India. In an interview with The Kolkata Telegraph, he commented:

Thanks to the media, people have started taking boxing seriously over the past two years. Everyone knows my name now because my achievements have been highlighted. Lekin boxing ka toh kuch promotion hi nahin hota India mein. (But boxing is still not promoted in India!) We don't have boxing academies, we don't even have proper boxing rings. I have lost count of the times I have approached the government and the sporting authorities for support, but nothing has happened. [...] In this country, everyone is hung up on cricket. Forget about boxing, India is doing so well in other sports too. Saina Nehwal is a great badminton player, the Indian tennis team has just won a Davis Cup tie, lekin hamare liye support kahan hai? (but where is the support for all of us?)

Although previously denied by him, Hindustan Times reported that the boxer took up a role in the part real part fictional Bollywood thriller tentatively titled One, to be directed by South Indian director Anand. The film was later revealed to be named Patiala Express, which is produced by Percept Limited. Shooting for the film was supposed to begin in early 2011. However, on 17 May 2011, Vijender married Archana Singh, a software engineer with an MBA degree, from Delhi. The wedding was solemnised in Delhi in a simple ceremony, and reception was organised at his native place Bhiwani. However, the wedding prompted the filmmakers to drop him from the project, as they felt that Vijender would not enjoy the same popularity among female fans. The film's launch was widely reported in March 2011, and actor Govinda had confirmed Vijender's debut with his daughter. Vijender refused to confirm if he has indeed been dropped from the film, saying that "I have to concentrate on my boxing. Wait before you see me in films."

Before the 2012 London Olympics, Vijender spoke to The Wall Street Journal about the increasing government bias to boost cricket. "I still fail to understand why only cricketers are given perks like free land, and so on. Come on, we boxers aren’t that bad either: We’re smart, intelligent and decent looking too! I’m working really hard to make my country proud. I hope someday my turn comes, too" he clarified. Vijender was approached by Percept Picture Company to act as a guide and counsellor to participants taking part in the Indian version of the boxing reality show The Contender, which follows a group of boxers competing with each other in a single elimination style-competition. He agreed despite being still contractually obligated with Infinity Optimal Solutions (IOS), a celebrity management firm who dealt with his media appearances and ramp walks as a male model. IOS successfully petitioned the Delhi High Court to bar him from entering into any deal with Percept.

Vijender appeared on Bollywood actor Salman Khan's game show 10 Ka Dum. He was accompanied by Bollywood actress Mallika Sherawat. Other appearances includes the fourth season of the Indian dance reality show Nach Baliye with actress Bipasha Basu. Vijender is credited by the critics and the media for bringing the sport of boxing back into the limelight in India. His rise to the top rank of the boxing world has been an inspiration for the younger generation and has brought more aspirants and followers, to the sport.

Vijender was one of the judges on MTV India's reality TV show Roadies X2.

=== Bollywood ===
Although previously denied by him, Hindustan Times reported that the boxer took up a role in the part real part fictional Bollywood thriller tentatively titled One, to be directed by South Indian director Anand. The film was later revealed to be named Patiala Express, which is produced by Percept Limited. Shooting for the film was supposed to begin in early 2011. However, on 17 May 2011, Vijender married Archana Singh, a software engineer with an MBA degree, from Delhi. The wedding was solemnised in Delhi in a simple ceremony, and reception was organised at his native place Bhiwani. However, the wedding prompted the filmmakers to drop him from the project, as they felt that Vijender would not enjoy the same popularity among female fans. The film's launch was widely reported in March 2011, and actor Govinda had confirmed Vijender's debut with his daughter. Vijender refused to confirm if he has indeed been dropped from the film, saying that "I have to concentrate on my boxing. Wait before you see me in films."

Vijender made his Bollywood debut as an actor in film Fugly, released on 13 June 2014. The film is produced by Grazing Goat Productions, owned by Akshay Kumar and Ashvini Yardi. The film got above average reviews.

=== Drug controversy ===
On 6 March 2012, during a raid conducted on an NRI residence near Chandigarh, Punjab Police seized 26 kilograms of heroin and other drugs, valued at ₹1.3 billion (US$13 million). They also recovered a car registered in the name of Vijender's wife from outside the home of alleged drug dealer Anoop Singh Kahlon. Later in March, a Punjab Police statement said, "As per investigation conducted so far, Vijender Singh consumed the drug about 12 times and Ram Singh (his sparring partner) about five times." Singh denied the allegations and refused to give his hair and blood samples for testing. However, NADA refused to test Vijender claiming protocol did not allow it to test an athlete for that drug when he was out of competition. However, the Sports Ministry of India directed NADA to conduct a test on the boxer since these reports were "disturbing and may have a debilitating influence on other sportspersons in the country". By mid-May 2013, Singh was given an "all-clean" certificate by the National Anti-Doping Agency.

== Professional boxing record ==
14 fights	13 wins	1 loss
By knockout	9	1
By decision	4	0

No.	Result	Record	Opponent	Type	Round, time	Date	Location	Notes
14	Win	13–1	(Ghana) Eliasu Sulley	KO	2 (6), 2:07	17 Aug 2022	Balbir Singh Juneja Indoor Stadium, Raipur, India	
13	Loss	12–1	(Russia) Artysh Lopsan	TKO	5 (8), 1:09	19 Mar 2021	Majestic Pride Casino, Goa, India	
12	Win	12–0	(Ghana) Charles Adamu	UD	8	22 Nov 2019	Caesars Palace Dubai, Dubai, United Arab Emirates	
11	Win	11–0	(United States) Mike Snider	KO	4 (8), 1:23	13 Jul 2019	(United States) Prudential Center, Newark, New Jersey, US	
10	Win	10–0	(Ghana) Ernest Amuzu	UD	10	23 Dec 2017	Sawai Mansingh Indoor Stadium, Jaipur, India	Retained WBO Asia Pacific, and WBO Oriental super-middleweight titles
9	Win	9–0	(China) Zulpikar Maimaitiali	UD	10	5 Aug 2017	Sardar Vallabhbhai Patel Indoor Stadium, Mumbai, India	Retained WBO Asia Pacific super-middleweight title; Won WBO Oriental super-middleweight title
8	Win	8–0	(Tanzania) Francis Cheka	TKO	3 (10), 1:36	17 Dec 2016	Thyagaraj Sports Complex, New Delhi, India	Retained WBO Asia Pacific super-middleweight title
7	Win	7–0	(Australia) Kerry Hope	UD	10	16 Jul 2016	Thyagaraj Sports Complex, New Delhi, India	Won vacant WBO Asia Pacific super-middleweight title
6	Win	6–0	(Poland) Andrzej Soldra	TKO	3 (8), 2:00	13 May 2016	(United Kingdom) Macron Stadium, Bolton, England	
5	Win	5–0	(France) Matiouze Royer	TKO	5 (6), 1:10	30 Apr 2016	(United Kingdom) Copper Box Arena, London, England	
4	Win	4–0	(Hungary) Alexander Horvath	KO	3 (6), 1:02	12 Mar 2016	(United Kingdom) Echo Arena, Liverpool, England	
3	Win	3–0	(Bulgaria) Samet Hyuseinov	TKO	2 (4), 0:35	19 Dec 2015	(United Kingdom) Manchester Arena, Manchester, England	
2	Win	2–0	(United Kingdom) Dean Gillen	KO	1 (4), 3:06	7 Nov 2015	(Republic of Ireland) National Stadium, Dublin, Ireland	
1	Win	1–0	(United Kingdom) Sonny Whiting	TKO	3 (4), 2:08	10 Oct 2015	(United Kingdom) Manchester Arena, Manchester, England	

== Political career ==
Vijender joined the Indian National Congress on the eve of the 2019 Indian general election and unsuccessfully contested the South Delhi constituency.

In April 2024, on the eve of 2024 Indian general election, he joined Bharatiya Janata Party at the party headquarters in New Delhi.

== Filmography ==
Year	Film	Role
2014	Fugly	Gaurav
2023	Kisi Ka Bhai Kisi Ki Jaan	Mahavir

== See also ==
- Boxing at the 2008 Summer Olympics – Middleweight
- Boxing at the 2012 Summer Olympics – Men's middleweight

Sporting positions
Regional boxing titles
Vacant Title last held by Rohan Murdock	WBO Asia Pacific super-middleweight champion 16 July 2016 – November 2018	Vacant Title next held by Abdallah Paziwapazi
Vacant Title last held by Zulpikar Maimaitiali	WBO Oriental super-middleweight champion 5 August 2017 – November 2018	Vacant Title next held by Rohan Murdock
