= Aleksandar Drenovak =

Serbian boxer (born 1983)

Aleksandar Drenovak (Serbian Cyrillic: Александар Дреновак; born 30 December 1983 in Kraljevo) is a Serbian middleweight boxer.

He lives in the Serbian spa town of Vrnjačka Banja, in the Raška District of southwestern Serbia. He is trained by his father, a former boxer.

When Drenovak qualified for the 2012 Summer Olympics in London by virtue of finishing fifth at the 2011 World Amateur Boxing Championships in Baku, Azerbaijan, he took Serbia back into the Olympic ring for the first time since 2000.

At the 2012 Olympics he beat Marlo Delgado from Ecuador, then lost 11:20 to Adem Kılıççı, eventually placing 13th in the event rankings.

In June 2015, Drenovak competed for Serbia at the first European Games in Baku. In March 2016 he was named Serbian National Boxing Champion: 75 kg middleweight.
