= Anthony Ogogo =

English boxer and professional wrestler

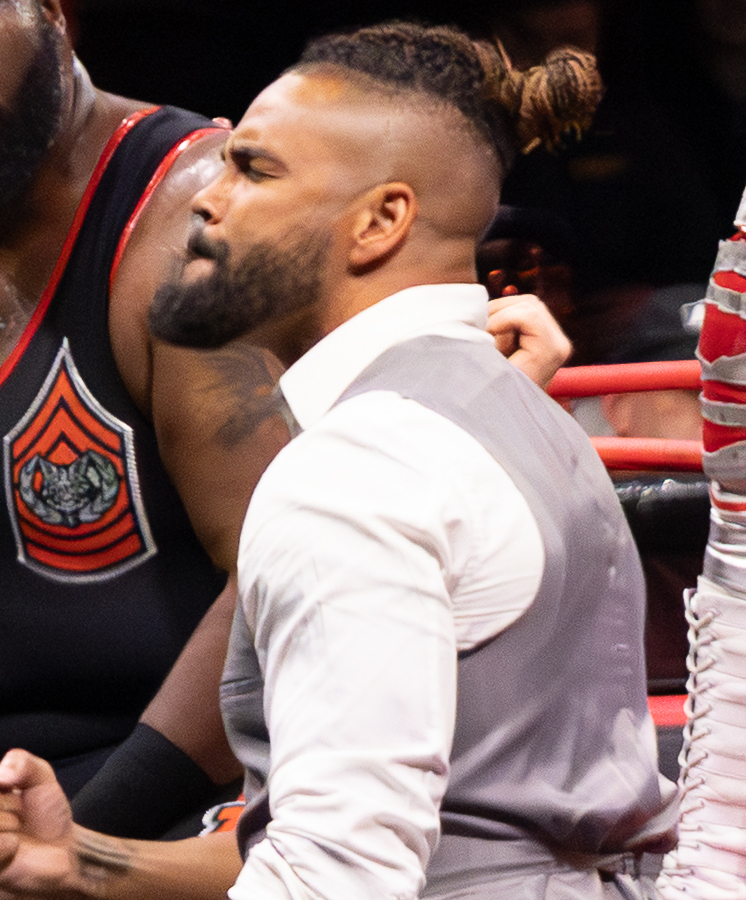
- Boxing career
- Nationality: English
- Born: Anthony Osejua Ojo Ogogo; 24 November 1988 (age 37) Lowestoft, Suffolk, England
- Height: 6 ft 1 in (185 cm)
- Weight class: Middleweight

Boxing record
- Total fights: 12
- Wins: 11
- Win by KO: 7
- Losses: 1
Medal record
Men's amateur boxing
Representing Great Britain
Olympic Games
Bronze medal – third place	2012 London	Middleweight
Representing England
Commonwealth Games
Silver medal – second place	2010 Delhi	Middleweight
- Professional wrestling career
- Spouse: Casey Wicks (m. 2017)
- Ring name: Anthony Ogogo
- Billed height: 6 ft 0 in (183 cm)
- Billed weight: 220 lb (100 kg)
- Billed from: The East of England
- Trained by: Cody Rhodes; Dustin Rhodes; Q. T. Marshall; Ricky Knight; Saraya Knight
- Debut: 23 February 2019

Anthony Osejua Ojo Ogogo (born 24 November 1988) is an English professional wrestler and former professional boxer. He is signed to All Elite Wrestling (AEW) and its sister promotion Ring of Honor (ROH), where he is a member of Shane Taylor Promotions. He also competes in his native England for Revolution Pro Wrestling (RevPro) and World Association of Wrestling (WAW). As a boxer, he competed from 2013 to 2016 as a professional and won a bronze medal in the middleweight division at the 2012 Olympics as an amateur. In 2015, Ogogo participated in the 13th series of Strictly Come Dancing.

== Early life ==
Ogogo was born to an English mother and a Nigerian father.

In his youth he attended many Football in the Community courses run by Norwich City, resulting in him being invited for a trial at the club and playing in their youth team.

== Amateur boxing career ==
=== 2004 Junior Olympics ===
Having taken up boxing aged 12, Ogogo won a gold medal in the 2004 Junior Olympics final held in Texas.

=== 2005 IABA Cadet World championships ===
In 2005, Ogogo won gold at the IABA Cadet World Championships in the 70 kg division by beating Ruslan Derbenev of Russia in the final. A 1,000-plus capacity crowd watched the bout at the St George's Hall in Liverpool.

=== 2010 Commonwealth Games ===
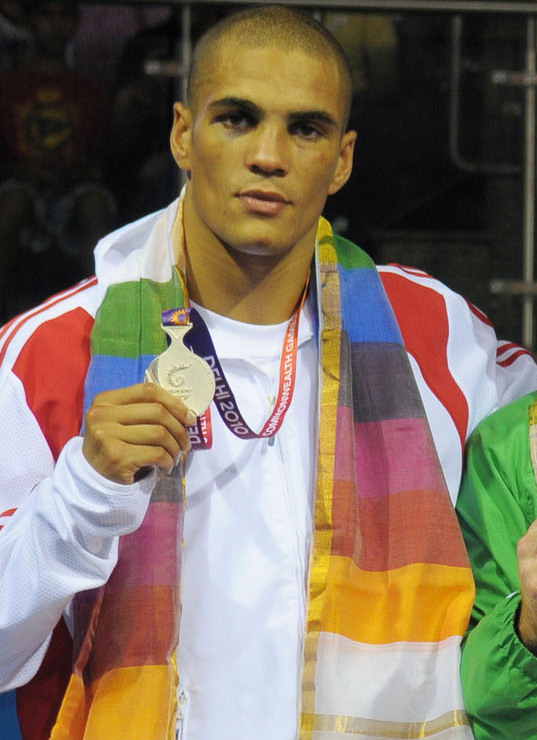
Ogogo at the 2010 Commonwealth Games.

Ogogo competed in the 2010 Commonwealth Games in Delhi, India in the Middleweight (75 kg) Division and won a silver medal after being defeated in the final by Northern Ireland's Eamonn O'Kane by a score of 16–4.

=== 2012 Olympic Games ===
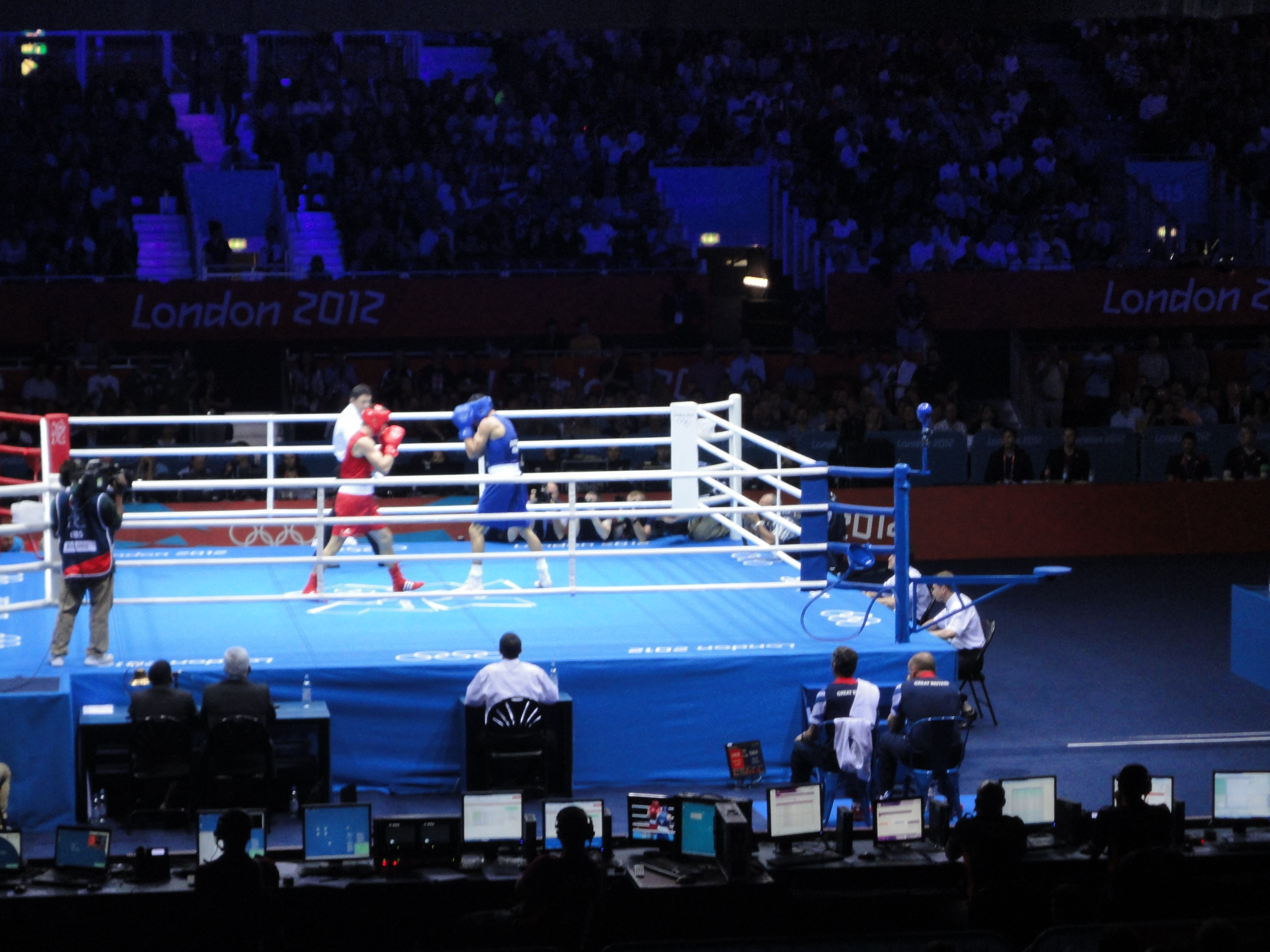
Round of 16 bout against Evhen Khytrov (red) at the 2012 Summer Olympics in London

Ogogo secured his place on the GB Boxing team for the 2012 London Olympics in Trabzon, Turkey in April 2012. Ogogo was the first of the British boxers to make their Olympic debut, on 28 July, opening with a round of 32 bout against Junior Castillo of Dominican Republic, who he beat by a score of 13–6. In his round of 16 bout, Ogogo entered the biggest fight, against world champion and world number one Ukrainian's Evhen Khytrov. With the judges' score drawn, and the 52–52 count-back score not separating the fighters, the decision went down to the judges to press either the blue or red pad based on their opinion as to who deserved the decision. The majority of the five officials chose Ogogo. One fight from a bronze medal, Ogogo fought Germany's Stefan Härtel in the quarter-finals. Ogogo continued his successful form with a 15–10 victory. He went on to box Brazilian Esquiva Falcão Florentino in the semi-final but his opponent proved to be too strong for him. Ogogo lost the bout 16:9, claiming a bronze medal. A post box in his home town of Lowestoft (on Rectory Road) was painted bronze in honour of this result, but has since been re-painted red.

== Professional boxing career ==
=== Early fights and injury ===
In December 2012, Ogogo signed his first professional contract, with Los Angeles-based promotional company Golden Boy Promotions.

He won his first professional bout against Kieron Gray, stopping him in the second round.

After 7 professional fights, Ogogo was out for a year after requiring surgery for an Achilles tendon injury.

=== Return and International middleweight title fight ===
During his comeback fight against Ruslan Schelev in July 2015 he dislocated his shoulder in the second round but continued until the end of the six rounds to take a unanimous decision. On 29 May 2016 Ogogo needed less than three rounds to win his comeback from injury. After a one-sided two-and-a-half round, Gary Cooper's corner threw in the towel to award Ogogo a successful return from a 10-month absence. Cooper was an 11th-hour replacement for Germany's Chris Herrmann in Glasgow on the undercard of Ricky Burns’ Super WBA super-lightweight title fight.

It was announced on 10 June that Ogogo would fight for the first time at the O2 Arena on the undercard of Anthony Joshua vs. Dominic Breazeale on 25 June. This would be part of a stacked card including George Groves, Martin Murray, Chris Eubank Jr, Conor Benn and Dillian Whyte. Ogogo defeated Frane Radnic (11-2, 10 KOs), after knocking Radnic down from left in the 1st round. Radnic did not return for round 2. Ogogo fought for the third time in just seven weeks against experienced 37 year old Bronislav Kubin (19-20-2, 12 KOs) in Berlin on the undercard of a super-middleweight world title fight. Ogogo won the fight via 2nd-round TKO. Kubin was knocked down twice in round one and four times in round 2 as the referee waved the fight off.

Ogogo's first title match was announced, which would take place at the Barclaycard Arena in Birmingham on 22 October on the undercard of the Frankie Gavin vs. Sam Eggington fight. Ogogo fought Craig Cunningham (16-1, 3 KOs) for the vacant WBC International middleweight title. Ogogo suffered his first loss since turning pro, having been dropped by Cunningham in round 2, who then controlled the remainder of the fight. Trainer Tony Sims pulled Ogogo out of the fight during the 8th round after a timeout by referee Ian John Lewis, due to blurred vision. Ogogo was also staggered by Cunningham's accurate counter punching in rounds four and five. It was confirmed after the fight that Ogogo fractured his eye socket and would be out until later 2017. In January 2017, Ogogo's promoter Nisse Sauerland said that he was recovering well and would make a return in the second half of 2017.

=== Blindness and retirement ===
In March 2017, still wanting to become a world champion, Ogogo was registered blind. He was advised to retire by a number of eye specialists. At this stage, Ogogo had undergone two operations on his left eye. Speaking to Lowestoft Journal, Ogogo said his driving licence was also taken away from him as he was not allowed to drive.

In January 2019, Ogogo expressed hope that after his eye surgery he could come back to the ring.

On 11 March 2019, having not fought since October 2016, Ogogo retired from boxing at the age of 30. He released a long statement thanking many names who had helped and guided him throughout his amateur and professional career, closing the statement with, "I’ve been through a lot in my career. I’ve had 17 operations and suffered every pain imaginable. I’ve won, lost, cried and hurt. But if you were to ask me would I do it again? In a heartbeat. I love this game." He retired with a record of 11 wins and one sole loss, during his short four-year professional career.

== Professional wrestling career ==
=== Early career (2019) ===
Following his retirement from boxing, Ogogo began his career in professional wrestling. On 23 February 2019, he made his wrestling debut in his hometown for the World Association of Wrestling (WAW).

=== All Elite Wrestling (2019–present) ===
In April 2019, Ogogo was featured on Cody Rhodes' Nightmare Family YouTube series, The Road to Double or Nothing. On 26 October 2019, it was announced that he had signed with Cody's All Elite Wrestling (AEW) promotion. Ogogo is AEW's first developmental wrestler, being trained by Dustin Rhodes and Q. T. Marshall. On 27 October 2020, Ogogo began appearing as a commentator on AEW Dark.

On 31 March 2021, Ogogo would make his debut on AEW Dynamite, attacking Cody Rhodes and aligning himself with Q. T. Marshall, Nick Comoroto, and Aaron Solo, establishing himself as a heel. He feuded with Cody Rhodes until AEW Double or Nothing 2021. Ogogo lost to Rhodes in a single match at the event. He would have one more in AEW before having eye surgery, and was out injured for 6 months. Ogogo returned to the ring on the 1 December taping of AEW Dark: Elevation in an eight-man tag match.

On the 6 April 2024 episode of AEW Collision, Ogogo returned to AEW, assisting Shane Taylor Promotions (Shane Taylor and Lee Moriarty) in attacking Chris Jericho and Hook, joining the stable in the process.

== Other ventures ==
On 3 January 2008, Ogogo entered Big Brother: Celebrity Hijack on Channel 4, finishing in fourth place. Anthony had a naked photoshoot for Attitude magazine and continues to work as a semi-professional model through his official website. He also appeared in an advert for the sandwich store chain, Subway alongside track and field athlete Holly Bleasdale and later gymnast Louis Smith. In 2013, he appeared in the third heat of the ITV diving show Splash!, making it through to the semi-final the following week. However, on the semi-final, Anthony had to withdraw due to an injury he sustained from his dive the previous week. On 21 August 2015, it was announced that Ogogo would be competing on Strictly Come Dancing, together with Oti Mabuse. They were eliminated second; on the third week of the competition. In February 2018, he took part in Celebrity Haunted Mansion on W. He has also appeared on Bear Grylls' The Island. In October 2016, Anthony was made an Honorary Fellow of the University of Suffolk. In September 2024 Anthony joined the cast of Celebrity SAS: Who Dares Wins. In October 2024, Ogogo appeared as a contestant on Richard Osman's House of Games (series 8, episodes 16-20).

== Professional boxing record ==
12 fights	11 wins	1 loss
By knockout	7	1
By decision	4	0

No.	Result	Record	Opponent	Type	Round, time	Date	Location	Notes
12	Loss	11–1	Craig Cunningham	TKO	8 (10), 1:27	22 Oct 2016	Barclaycard Arena, Birmingham, England	For vacant WBC International middleweight title
11	Win	11–0	Bronislav Kubin	TKO	2 (8), 2:38	23 Jul 2016	Max Schmeling Halle, Berlin, Germany	
10	Win	10–0	Frane Radnić	RTD	1 (6), 3:00	25 Jun 2016	The O2 Arena, London, England	
9	Win	9–0	Gary Cooper	TKO	3 (6), 1:26	28 May 2016	SSE Hydro, Glasgow, Scotland	
8	Win	8–0	Ruslan Schelev	UD	6	18 Jul 2015	Gerry Weber Stadion, Halle, Germany	
7	Win	7–0	Wayne Reed	TKO	5 (6), 1:06	12 Jul 2014	Echo Arena, Liverpool, England	
6	Win	6–0	Jonel Tapia	TKO	3 (8), 0:46	3 May 2014	MGM Grand Garden Arena, Paradise, Nevada, US	
5	Win	5–0	Greg O'Neill	PTS	6	1 Mar 2014	Scottish Exhibition Centre, Glasgow, Scotland	
4	Win	4–0	Dan Blackwell	PTS	6	14 Dec 2013	ExCel Arena, London, England	
3	Win	3–0	Gary Boulden	TKO	5 (6), 0:33	13 Jul 2013	Craven Park, Hull, England	
2	Win	2–0	Edgar Perez	UD	6	18 May 2013	Boardwalk Hall, Atlantic City, New Jersey, US	
1	Win	1–0	Kieron Gray	TKO	2 (6), 2:00	27 Apr 2013	Motorpoint Arena, Sheffield, England	
