= Sobirjon Nazarov =

Tajikistani boxer (born 1991)

Sobirdzhon Nazarov (3 February 1991, Dushanbe) is a Tajikistani boxer who competes as a middleweight. At the 2012 Summer Olympics he was defeated in the heats of the Men's middleweight by Mujandjae Kasuto.
