= Danabek Suzhanov =

Kazakhstani boxer

Personal information
- Nationality: Kazakhstan
- Born: 26 December 1984 (age 41)
- Height: 5 ft 11 in (180 cm)
- Weight: Middleweight

Boxing career
Medal record
Representing Kazakhstan
Men's boxing
Asian Games
Bronze medal – third place	2010 Guangzhou	Middleweight

Danabek Suzhanov is an amateur boxer. His club is School of Boxing in Oskemen.

Coached by Vladimir Rechitskiy he represented Kazakhstan in the 2012 Summer Olympics taking place in London in the Middleweight Division. In the Round of 32 he lost to Vijender Singh of India 10–14.

== Achievements ==
- 2012 – Republic of Kazakhstan President's Cup (Almaty, KAZ) 1st place – 75 kg
- 2012 – Chemistry Cup (Halle, GER) 3rd place – 75 kg
- 2012 – International Team Tournament (Almaty, KAZ) 2nd place – 75 kg
- 2011 – Makar Mazay Memorial Tournament (Mariupol, UKR) 3rd place – 75 kg
- 2011 – Nurmagambetov Tournament (Almaty, KAZ) 3rd place – 75 kg
- 2011 – Gagik Tsarukyan Memorial Tournament (Yerevan, ARM) 3rd place – 75 kg
- 2011 – Great Silk Way Tournament (Baku, AZE) 2nd place – 75 kg
- 2011 – Kazakh National Championships 1st place – 75 kg
- 2010 – Asian Games (Guangzhou, CHN) 3rd place – 75 kg
- 2010 – Republic of Kazakhstan President's Cup (Astana, KAZ) 2nd place – 75 kg
- 2010 – Grand Prix Usti nad Labem (Usti nad Labem, CZE) 2nd place – 75 kg
- 2010 – Kazakh National Championships 1st place – 75 kg
- 2009 – Ahmet Comert Tournament (Istanbul, TUR) 3rd place – 75 kg
