= Andranik Hakobyan (boxer) =

Armenian boxer

Personal information
- Full name: Անդրանիկ Հակոբյան
- Nationality: Armenia
- Born: 6 October 1981 (age 44) Vagharshapat, Armenian SSR, USSR
- Height: 1.85 m (6 ft 1 in)
- Weight: 76 kg (168 lb)

Sport
- Sport: Boxing
- Weight class: Middleweight
Medal record
World Amateur Championships
Silver medal – second place	2009 Milan	Middleweight
World Cup
Gold medal – first place	2008 Moscow	Middleweight

Andranik Hakobyan (Armenian: Անդրանիկ Հակոբյան, born 6 October 1981 in Vagharshapat, Armenian SSR) is an Armenian amateur boxer. He is a World Cup winner, World silver medalist and two-time Olympian.

== Biography ==
Andranik Hakobyan was born on 6 October 1981. Hakobyan participated at the 2008 Summer Olympics in Beijing. He won in the first round of the Olympic tournament, but lost in the second. In late 2008, Andranik got the right to compete at the 2008 Boxing World Cup in Moscow. The tournament brought together the best amateur boxers in all weight classes. Hakobyan was able to show all his capability and won the Cup in the middleweight (75 kg) category.

Hakobyan won a silver medal at the 2009 World Amateur Boxing Championships in Milan. After winning five straight matches, he lost to Abbos Atoev in the finals. Hakobyan won independent Armenia's first silver medal at the World Amateur Boxing Championships. Hakobyan became an Armenian Champion in 2010. Although he lost in the quarterfinals at the 2011 World Amateur Boxing Championships due to controversial scoring, his performance was still good enough to qualify for the 2012 Summer Olympics, where he was unable to win a medal.
