= Abbos Atoev =

Uzbekistani boxer (born 1986)

Abbos Atoyev
Personal information
- Native name: Аббос Аттаев
- Full name: Abbos Atoyev
- Nationality: Uzbekistan
- Born: 7 June 1986 (age 40) Vabkent District, Bukhara Province
- Height: 1.75 m (5 ft 9 in)
- Weight: 81 kg (179 lb)

Sport
- Sport: Boxing
- Weight class: Middleweight
Medal record
Summer Olympics
Bronze medal – third place	2012 London	Middleweight
World Amateur Championships
Gold medal – first place	2007 Chicago	Light Heavyweight
Gold medal – first place	2009 Milan	Middleweight
Asian Championships
Gold medal – first place	2007 Ulan Bator	Light Heavyweight
Asian Games
Silver medal – second place	2010 Guangzhou	Middleweight

Abbos Abdurazzoqovich Atoyev (born 7 June 1986) is an amateur boxer from Uzbekistan, best known for winning gold in the light heavyweight competition at the 2007 World Championships where he defeated and upset heavy favourite Artur Beterbiev which to this was his only loss, and at middleweight in 2009. He also won a bronze medal at the 2012 Summer Olympics. He fights southpaw and was born in the village of Qulkhatib of Vabkent District of Bukhara Province.

== Career ==
In June 2007 he won the 2007 Asian Amateur Boxing Championships, beating future Olympic champion Zhang Xiaoping in the final.

At the 2007 World Championships he defeated Frenchman Mamadou Diambang inside the distance, Croatian Marijo Šivolija in the quarterfinals, and Yerkebuian Shynaliyev of Kazakhstan in the semifinals. In the final, he sensationally upset Russian favorite Artur Beterbiyev after being knocked down in the third and trailing but edging it out back down the stretch.

At the 2008 Olympics, he was upset by Jahon Qurbonov in his first bout.

=== Middleweight ===
In 2009, he dropped down to middleweight and won the gold at the 2009 World Amateur Boxing Championships. At the 2010 Asian Games, he was shut out 0–7 in the final against Vijender Singh of India. At the 2011 World Amateur Boxing Championships, he was knocked out in the first round by Ryōta Murata of Japan.

At the 2012 Summer Olympics, he defeated Moroccan Badreddine Haddioui 11:9, Romanian Bogdan Juratoni 12:10 and Vijender Singh 17:13. He lost to Ryōta Murata 12:13 in the semi-final and had to settle for bronze.
