= Cho Deok-jin =

South Korean boxer

Cho Deok-Jin
Personal information
- Full name: 조 덕진
- Nationality: South Korea
- Born: February 20, 1983 (age 43)
- Height: 1.78 m (5 ft 10 in)
- Weight: 75 kg (165 lb)

Sport
- Sport: Boxing
- Weight class: Middleweight
- Club: Korea Armed Forces
Medal record
Asian Championships
Silver medal – second place	2005 Ho Chi Minh City	Middleweight

- Cho Deok-jin
- Hangul: 조덕진
- RR: Jo Deokjin
- MR: Cho Tŏkchin

Cho Deok-Jin (born February 20, 1983) is a Korean amateur boxer who qualified for the 2008 Olympics at light heavyweight after he was reallocated a place.
