= Mohammad Sattarpour =

Iranian boxer

Personal information
- Born: May 22, 1988 (age 38) Tehran, Iran
Medal record
Men's Boxing
Representing Iran
Asian Games
Bronze medal – third place	2006 Doha	Welterweight
Bronze medal – third place	2010 Guangzhou	Middleweight
Asian Championships
Bronze medal – third place	2007 Ulan Bator	Middleweight

Mohammad Sattarpour (Persian: محمد ستارپور, born May 22, 1988, in Tehran) is an amateur boxer from Iran who competed in the Welterweight (-69 kg) division at the 2006 Asian Games winning the bronze medal in a lost bout in the semifinals against Thailand's eventual silver medalist Angkhan Chomphuphuang 18–36. During the 2010 Asian Games in Guangzhou, he reached the semifinals but eventually lost against India's Vijender Singh after putting up a fierce fight in a close bout of 10–7. He won a bronze medal.
