= 2011 AIBA World Boxing Championships =

Boxing competitions

- Venue: Heydar Aliyev Sports and Exhibition Complex
- Location: Baku, Azerbaijan
- Start date: September 22, 2011
- End date: October 10, 2011
- Competitors: 685 from 127 nations

The 2011 AIBA World Boxing Championships was held at the Heydar Aliyev Sports and Exhibition Complex in Baku, Azerbaijan from September 22 to October 10, 2011.

The competition ran under the supervision of the world's governing body for amateur boxing, the AIBA, and followed on from the biggest World Championships in AIBA history which was held in Milan, Italy in 2009.

This world championship served as a qualifier for the 2012 Summer Olympics. 685 boxers participated from 127 countries.

The preliminary rounds started on September 26 with the finals being held on October 10.

== Results ==
=== Medal table ===
Rank	Nation	Gold	Silver	Bronze	Total
1	Ukraine	4	1	0	5
2	Cuba	2	1	0	3
3	Azerbaijan	1	1	0	2
4	Russia	1	0	2	3
5	Brazil	1	0	1	2
5	China	1	0	1	2
7	Kazakhstan	0	2	2	4
8	England	0	2	1	3
9	Japan	0	1	0	1
9	South Korea	0	1	0	1
9	Wales	0	1	0	1
12	Italy	0	0	2	2
12	Uzbekistan	0	0	2	2
14	Belarus	0	0	1	1
14	Germany	0	0	1	1
14	India	0	0	1	1
14	Ireland	0	0	1	1
14	Lithuania	0	0	1	1
14	Mongolia	0	0	1	1
14	Romania	0	0	1	1
14	Tajikistan	0	0	1	1
14	United States	0	0	1	1
Totals (22 entries)		10	10	20	40

=== Medal summary ===
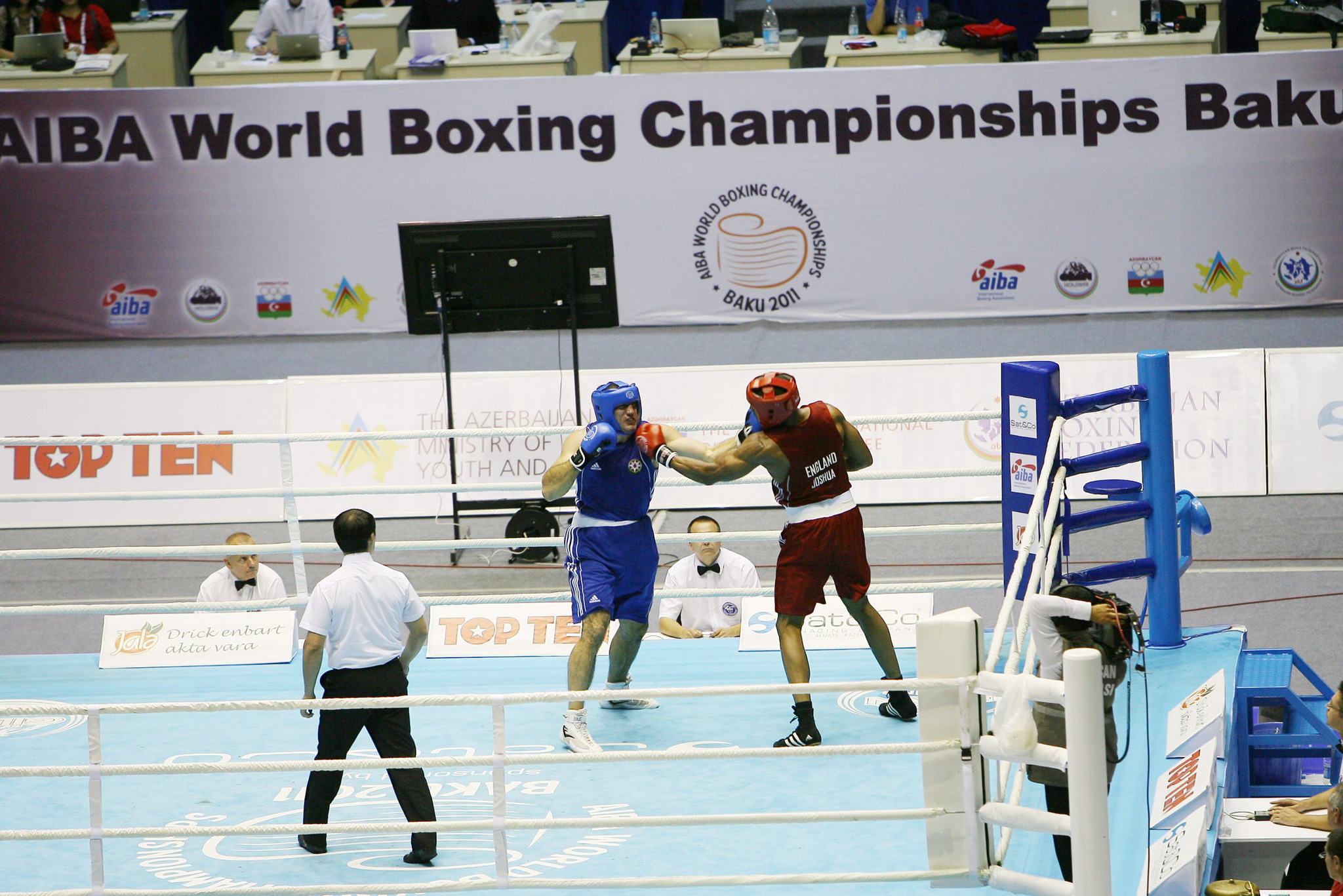
Final bout between Anthony Joshua and Magomedrasul Majidov

Event	Gold	Silver	Bronze
Light flyweight	Zou Shiming; China	Shin Jong-Hun; South Korea	Pürevdorjiin Serdamba; Mongolia
Light flyweight	Zou Shiming; China	Shin Jong-Hun; South Korea	David Ayrapetyan; Russia
Flyweight	Misha Aloyan; Russia	Andrew Selby; Wales	Rau'shee Warren; United States
Flyweight	Misha Aloyan; Russia	Andrew Selby; Wales	Jasurbek Latipov; Uzbekistan
Bantamweight	Lázaro Álvarez; Cuba	Luke Campbell; England	John Joe Nevin; Ireland
Bantamweight	Lázaro Álvarez; Cuba	Luke Campbell; England	Anvar Yunusov; Tajikistan
Lightweight	Vasyl Lomachenko; Ukraine	Yasniel Toledo; Cuba	Domenico Valentino; Italy
Lightweight	Vasyl Lomachenko; Ukraine	Yasniel Toledo; Cuba	Gani Zhailauov; Kazakhstan
Light welterweight	Éverton Lopes; Brazil	Denys Berinchyk; Ukraine	Tom Stalker; England
Light welterweight	Éverton Lopes; Brazil	Denys Berinchyk; Ukraine	Vincenzo Mangiacapre; Italy
Welterweight	Taras Shelestyuk; Ukraine	Serik Sapiyev; Kazakhstan	Egidijus Kavaliauskas; Lithuania
Welterweight	Taras Shelestyuk; Ukraine	Serik Sapiyev; Kazakhstan	Vikas Krishan Yadav; India
Middleweight	Evhen Khytrov; Ukraine	Ryota Murata; Japan	Esquiva Falcão; Brazil
Middleweight	Evhen Khytrov; Ukraine	Ryota Murata; Japan	Bogdan Juratoni; Romania
Light heavyweight	Julio César La Cruz; Cuba	Adilbek Niyazymbetov; Kazakhstan	Egor Mekhontsev; Russia
Light heavyweight	Julio César La Cruz; Cuba	Adilbek Niyazymbetov; Kazakhstan	Elshod Rasulov; Uzbekistan
Heavyweight	Oleksandr Usyk; Ukraine	Teymur Mammadov; Azerbaijan	Siarhei Karneyeu; Belarus
Heavyweight	Oleksandr Usyk; Ukraine	Teymur Mammadov; Azerbaijan	Wang Xuanxuan; China
Super Heavyweight	Magomedrasul Majidov; Azerbaijan	Anthony Joshua; England	Erik Pfeifer; Germany
Super Heavyweight	Magomedrasul Majidov; Azerbaijan	Anthony Joshua; England	Ivan Dychko; Kazakhstan

== Participating countries ==
685 competitors from 127 countries participated.

- Afghanistan (5)
- Albania (4)
- Algeria (8)
- Angola (4)
- Argentina (7)
- Armenia (7)
- Australia (10)
- Austria (1)
- Azerbaijan (9)
- Bahamas (2)
- Barbados (2)
- Belarus (10)
- Benin (1)
- Bolivia (2)
- Bosnia and Herzegovina (5)
- Botswana (2)
- Brazil (6)
- Bulgaria (10)
- Burkina Faso (2)
- Canada (5)
- Cambodia (2)
- Cayman Islands (2)
- Cameroon (5)
- China (10)
- Chinese Taipei (4)
- Colombia (7)
- Comoros (4)
- Ivory Coast (1)
- Croatia (5)
- Cuba (10)
- Democratic Republic of the Congo (10)
- Czech Republic (5)
- Denmark (4)
- Dominica (4)
- Dominican Republic (5)
- Ecuador (8)
- Egypt (9)
- El Salvador (3)
- Estonia (3)
- Ethiopia (8)
- Finland (1)
- France (8)
- Gabon (7)
- Gambia (4)
- Georgia (10)
- Germany (10)
- Ghana (7)
- United Kingdom
  - England (9)
  - Scotland (1)
  - Wales (5)
- Greece (3)
- Guatemala (2)
- Haiti (4)
- Hungary (10)
- Iceland (1)
- Indonesia (5)
- India (10)
- Iran (9)
- Iraq (8)
- Ireland (10)
- Israel (2)
- Italy (9)
- Jamaica (2)
- Japan (8)
- Jordan (4)
- Latvia (4)
- Lithuania (7)
- Kazakhstan (9)
- Kenya (10)
- Kyrgyzstan (9)
- Kuwait (1)
- Macedonia (4)
- Malaysia (2)
- Mali (1)
- Mauritius (6)
- Mexico (10)
- Moldova (8)
- Monaco (8)
- Mongolia (8)
- Montenegro (2)
- Morocco (9)
- Myanmar (2)
- Nauru (1)
- Nepal (2)
- Netherlands (3)
- New Zealand (4)
- Nicaragua (2)
- Niger (2)
- Norway (3)
- Pakistan (6)
- Philippines (6)
- Poland (10)
- Portugal (1)
- Romania (8)
- Russia (10)
- Rwanda (6)
- Saint Lucia (2)
- Saint Vincent and the Grenadines (1)
- Saudi Arabia (5)
- Serbia (5)
- Senegal (4)
- Seychelles (4)
- Sierra Leone (9)
- Slovakia (6)
- Slovenia (1)
- South Africa (4)
- South Korea (8)
- Spain (4)
- Sri Lanka (3)
- Eswatini (1)
- Sweden (6)
- Tajikistan (10)
- Thailand (8)
- Turkmenistan (6)
- Tanzania (8)
- Togo (2)
- Tonga (2)
- Trinidad and Tobago (2)
- Tunisia (4)
- Turkey (10)
- Uganda (10)
- Ukraine (10)
- United States (10)
- Uzbekistan (10)
- Venezuela (8)
- Vietnam (1)
