= Zhang Jianting =

Chinese boxer

Medal record

Representing China

Asian Games
Bronze medal – third place	Doha 2006	Middleweight

Zhang Jianting is a Chinese boxer who won bronze at the Asian Championships 2006 at middleweight. He also won the Asian Championships 2009.
