= 2013 AIBA World Boxing Championships – Middleweight =

Boxing competitions

The Middleweight competition at the 2013 AIBA World Boxing Championships was held from 17 to 26 October 2013. Boxers were limited to a weight of 75 kilograms.

== Medalists ==
Gold	Zhanibek Alimkhanuly (KAZ)
Silver	Jason Quigley (IRL)
Bronze	Artem Chebotarev (RUS)
Bronze	Antony Fowler (ENG)

== Seeds ==
1. (Brazil) Esquiva Florentino (third round)
2. (Ukraine) Dmytro Mytrofanov (third round)
3. (Romania) Bogdan Juratoni (quarterfinals)
4. (Hungary) Zoltán Harcsa (quarterfinals)
5. (Republic of Ireland) Jason Quigley (final)
6. (Kazakhstan) Zhanibek Alimkhanuly (champion)
7. (Germany) Stefan Härtel (quarterfinals)
8. (Serbia) Aleksandar Drenovak (third round)
9. (Tajikistan) Navruz Jafoev (second round)
10. (Georgia (country)) Jaba Khositashvili (second round)

== Draw ==
=== Finals ===
Semifinals
1	(Russia) Artem Chebotarev	0
4	(Republic of Ireland) Jason Quigley	3
3	(Kazakhstan) Zhanibek Alimkhanuly	w/o
2	(England) Antony Fowler

Final
(Republic of Ireland) Jason Quigley	0
(Kazakhstan) Zhanibek Alimkhanuly	3

=== Top half ===
==== Section 1 ====
First round
(Belarus) Vitali Bandarenka	2
(United States) Le'Shawn Rodriguez	1
(Guyana) Dennis Thomas
(Russia) Artem Chebotarev	TKO
(Uzbekistan) Azizbek Abdugofurov	TKO
(Seychelles) Jovette Jean
(Morocco) Badreddine Haddioui
(Turkmenistan) Aziz Achilov	TKO

Second round
(Brazil) Esquiva Florentino	2
(Belarus) Vitali Bandarenka	1
(Russia) Artem Chebotarev	TKO
(Australia) Ross Weaver
(Tajikistan) Navruz Jafoev	0
(Uzbekistan) Azizbek Abdugofurov	3
(Turkmenistan) Aziz Achilov	0
(Serbia) Aleksandar Drenovak	3

Third round
(Brazil) Esquiva Florentino	0
(Russia) Artem Chebotarev	3
(Uzbekistan) Azizbek Abdugofurov	3
(Serbia) Aleksandar Drenovak	0

Quarterfinals
(Russia) Artem Chebotarev	TKO
(Uzbekistan) Azizbek Abdugofurov

==== Section 2 ====
First round
(India) Vijender Singh	3
(Sweden) Hampus Henriksson	0
(South Korea) Jeong Jae-Min	2
(Armenia) Arman Hovhikyan	1
(Croatia) Sanjin-Pol Vrgoč	0
(Canada) Brody Blair	3
(Estonia) Kaupo Arro	0
(Kenya) Nickson Abaka	3

Second round
(Republic of Ireland) Jason Quigley	2
(India) Vijender Singh	0
(South Korea) Jeong Jae-Min	0
(Scotland) Aston Brown	2
(Palestine) Mahmoud Shabab	0
(Canada) Brody Blair	3
(Kenya) Nickson Abaka	0
(Hungary) Zoltán Harcsa	3

Third round
(Republic of Ireland) Jason Quigley	3
(Scotland) Aston Brown	0
(Canada) Brody Blair	0
(Hungary) Zoltán Harcsa	3

Quarterfinals
(Republic of Ireland) Jason Quigley	3
(Hungary) Zoltán Harcsa	0

=== Bottom half ===
==== Section 3 ====
First round
(Japan) Ryota Hamazaki	0
(China) Wen Yinhang	3
(Israel) Konstantin Snigour	0
(Mongolia) Narmandakhyn Shinebayar	3
(Italy) Raffaele Munno	0
(Mexico) Juan Mercado	3
(Jamaica) Janathan Hanson
(Azerbaijan) Soltan Migitinov	TKO

Second round
(Romania) Bogdan Juratoni	3
(China) Wen Yinhang	0
(Mongolia) Narmandakhyn Shinebayar	1
(Poland) Michał Kowalczyk	2
(Kyrgyzstan) Azamat Kanybekuulu	0
(Mexico) Juan Mercado	3
(Azerbaijan) Soltan Migitinov	0
(Kazakhstan) Zhanibek Alimkhanuly	3

Third round
(Romania) Bogdan Juratoni	3
(Poland) Michał Kowalczyk	0
(Mexico) Juan Mercado
(Kazakhstan) Zhanibek Alimkhanuly	TKO

Quarterfinals
(Romania) Bogdan Juratoni	0
(Kazakhstan) Zhanibek Alimkhanuly	3

==== Section 4 ====
First round
(Cuba) Ramon Nicolas	3
(Slovenia) Aljaž Venko	0
(Thailand) Aphisit Khankhokkhruea	0
(Egypt) Hosam Abdin	3
(England) Antony Fowler	3
(Moldova) Victor Carapcevschii	0
(Venezuela) Juan Patino	3
(Senegal) Mamadou Fall	0

Second round
(Germany) Stefan Härtel	3
(Cuba) Ramon Nicolas	0
(Egypt) Hosam Abdin	3
(Georgia (country)) Jaba Khositashvili	0
(Algeria) Abdelmalek Rahou	0
(England) Antony Fowler	3
(Venezuela) Juan Patino	0
(Ukraine) Dmytro Mytrofanov	3

Third round
(Germany) Stefan Härtel	3
(Egypt) Hosam Abdin	0
(England) Antony Fowler	3
(Ukraine) Dmytro Mytrofanov	0

Quarterfinals
(Germany) Stefan Härtel	1
(England) Antony Fowler	2
