= Jason Quigley (boxer) =

Irish boxer

Personal information
- Nicknames: El Animal, Team Frost
- Nationality: Irish
- Born: Jason Robert Quigley; 19 May 1991 (age 35) Ballybofey, County Donegal, Ireland
- Height: 6 ft 1 in (185 cm)
- Weight: Middleweight; Super-middleweight

Boxing career
- Reach: 72 1/2 in (184 cm)
- Stance: Orthodox

Boxing record
- Total fights: 23
- Wins: 20
- Win by KO: 14
- Losses: 3
Medal record
Representing (Republic of Ireland) Ireland
World Amateur Championships
Silver medal – second place	2013 Almaty	Middleweight
European Amateur Championships
Gold medal – first place	2013 Minsk	Middleweight
European Under-23 Championships
Gold medal – first place	2012 Kaliningrad	Middleweight
European Youth Championships
Gold medal – first place	2009 Szezecin	Welterweight

Jason Robert Quigley (born 19 May 1991) is an Irish professional boxer who challenged for the WBO middleweight title in November 2021. At regional level he held the WBC-NABF middleweight title from 2017 to 2019 and the WBO-NABO middleweight title from May to November 2021.

== Amateur career ==
Quigley had an extremely promising amateur career, which saw him rise to number one in both the AIBA European and World amateur rankings. His place in the Ireland team had seemed secured for the 2016 Summer Olympics, however he decided to turn professional instead.

In 2009, Quigley participated in the European Youth Championships in Szezecin. He fought Joni Polishsuk of Finland, Catalin Paraschiveanu of Romania, Muratcan Buğra Oner of Turkey and Jaba Khocitashvili of Georgia, before defeating Emil Ahmadov of Azerbaijan 6–1 in the 69 kg final, to take home gold.

Quigley won gold at the 2011 'Gee Bee' Multi-Nations tournament in Helsinki, Finland, defeating English fighter Anthony Ogogo 14–5 with an acclaimed performance in the final.

Quigley boxed in the WSB for the 2011–2012 season. Organised by the AIBA, the competition was designed to offer professional boxing without competitors having to forfeit their amateur status. With twelve teams fighting across the competition, it was the LA Matadors who drafted Quigley. Quigley then lived and trained in Los Angeles where he met Russian fighter Vitali Bandarenka of Moscow Dynamo in his first bout. Quigley won the fight by unanimous decision with the judges scoring them 50–45, 48–47 and 48–47 after five rounds. Quigley's second fight was against Australian, Troy Trevor O'Meley of Bangkok Elephants. He won via second-round TKO, having led 10–8, 10–7, 10–8 at the end of the first.

In May 2012, Quigley competed at the 'Algirdas Socikas' Multi-Nations tournament in Kaunas, Lithuania. He overcame Estonian fighter Artjom Fjodorov, 16–6, and Lithuanian fighter Mantas Balciauskas, 11–3, before taking gold against Denmark's Matouk Belai with another dominant 18–5 win in the final. Quigley won his next gold at the 2012 European U23 Championships, in Kaliningrad, Russia. He met Germany's Dennis Radovan in the final, winning by a 17–11 decision at Kaliningrad's Sports Palace. Quigley defeated Russian southpaw Maksim Timofeev and Moldova's Victor Carapchevschii in the previous rounds.

In March 2013, Quigley took gold at the Ústí nad Labem Grand Prix in the Czech Republic. He beat Czech native Vit Kral by a score of 20–6 in his first fight, before defeating Chinese fighter Zhou Yunfei 14–7. In the final, he met Serbia's Aleksandar Drenovak for another 14–6 victory.

In June, he won gold again in the European Amateur Boxing Championships in Minsk. Quigley beat world number one Evhen Khytrov, before defeating Bogdan Juratoni in the middleweight final. The Romanian had previously been a bronze medalist in the tournament.

Quigley's final amateur medal came in October, when he claimed silver at the World Amateur Boxing Championships in Almaty. In the semi-finals, Quigley took all three rounds in a victory over Russian boxer Artem Chebotarev. In the other semi-final, Englishman Anthony Fowler was forced to give his opponent a walkover after suffering a hand injury in the lead up to the fight. As a result, Quigley met the much fresher Zhanibek Alimkhanuly in the following day's final. The local Kazakh fighter took gold with a narrow win, in what was Quigley's first loss in an 18-month run of 33 fights.

=== World Series of Boxing record ===
2 Wins (1 Knockout), 0 Losses, 0 Draws
Result	Record	Team	Opponent (Team)	Type	Round	Date	Location	Notes
Win	2-0	LA Matadors	(Australia) Troy Trevor O'Meley (Bangkok Elephants)	TKO	2 (5)	2011-12-21	The Music Box, Hollywood, Los Angeles, CA, United States	
Win	1-0	LA Matadors	(Russia) Vitali Bandarenka (Moscow Dynamo)	UD	5 (5)	2011-12-04	The Music Box, Hollywood, Los Angeles, CA, United States	WSB debut.

== Professional career ==
=== Golden Boy signing ===
In April 2014, it was announced that Quigley was turning professional and had signed a promotional contract with Golden Boy Promotions in Los Angeles. After signing, Golden Boy founder and president, Oscar De La Hoya said "Jason Quigley is part of the next generation of European boxers who are about to make their mark on the international stage". He went on to say "It also doesn’t hurt that he has the great nation of Ireland behind him, and I know they will support him wherever he goes."

=== Quigley vs. Reece ===
Quigley made his professional debut on 12 July 2014 as a middleweight, against Howard Reece at the MGM Grand Garden Arena in Las Vegas. The fight featured on the undercard of Canelo vs Lara, and Quigley won the bout via TKO, just 82 seconds into the first round. "I’m absolutely buzzing", Quigley said afterwards. "I’m delighted to be on a show like this and to win is unbelievable".

=== Quigley vs. Najera ===
Quigley's second professional win came against Fernando Najera, with Najera's corner ending it in the third round.

=== Quigley vs. McCoy ===
On 30 October 2014, Quigley continued his unbeaten start to professional boxing. Fighting in Plymouth, Massachusetts, an area rich with Irish support, Quigley fought Greg McCoy. The fight did not make it out of the first round, with a Quigley left hook, right straight combination sending McCoy to the canvas just 2 minutes and 39 seconds into the bout.

=== Quigley vs. Dardar ===
“Quigley has what it takes to be a champion – that’s why we signed him”

— Oscar De La Hoya, speaking before the Lanny Dardar fight.

Quigley's first fight of 2015 came as part of Golden Boy's "LA Fight Club", this time held at the Belasco Theatre in Los Angeles. Quigley's opponent was Lanny Dardar in the final fight of the night, and in yet another completely one sided contest, the American received two standing eight counts before an inevitable stoppage just 93 seconds into the first round.

=== Quigley vs. Agunbiade ===
Just two weeks later, Quigley was back in the ring again, this time facing Tolutomi Agunbiade at the Fantasy Springs Resort Casino in Indio, California. The fight was another dominant performance from Quigley, with the referee stepping in 1 minute and 43 seconds into the second round, when it became obvious that Agunbiade was no longer capable of defending himself.

=== Quigley vs. Snyder ===
n 30 April, Quigley returned to the Fantasy Springs Resort to face Joshua Snyder. 44 seconds into round 2, Quigley caught him with a vicious left hook, and followed it up with another big right to confirm the KO over Snyder who was already spiraling towards the canvas.

=== Quigley vs. Howard ===
His next fight was against Mississippi based, Tom Howard. Quigley fought him on 11 July 2015, at the Los Angeles Memorial Sports Arena. The American had won 8 of his 11 professional fights, and had never been KO'd in his career. Despite this, Quigley picked up where he had left off against Joshua Snyder, outclassing his opponent from the first bell. Howard had to pick himself off the canvas twice during the fight, before the referee eventually stepped in and put an end to it in the second round.

=== Quigley vs. Faulk ===
As he returned to the Fantasy Springs Resort Casino for the third time, Quigley fought Michael Faulk, his first southpaw opponent in pro boxing. In a night where The Ring TV commentators dubbed him "El Animal", Quigley continued his perfect record, scoring another emphatic second-round knockout. After a less eventful opening round in which Quigley used his jab and straight right to good effect, Faulk was sent to the canvas three times in the second. Faulk's threw the towel in.

“I just feel he's one of our top prospects, if not our top one”

— Eric Gomez, Senior Vice President (Golden Boy).

=== Quigley vs. Adkins ===
Quigley was taken the distance for the first time in his pro career, when he faced Marchristopher Adkins at the Hard Rock Hotel and Casino in Las Vegas. The American, unbeaten since his first professional bout, was on a six fight win streak in which he became the first fighter to defeat Shane Mosley Jr. Quigley took the four-rounder via Unanimous Decision.

=== Quigley vs. Lopez ===
In February 2016, Golden Boy V.P. Eric Perez confirmed that Quigley would be returning to the ring in late March on another card at Fantasy Springs. Perez stated "he'll fight there and then after that we'll bring him back, possibly on the Canelo card." Canelo is booked to defend his titles against England's Amir Khan, at the new T-Mobile Arena in Las Vegas. On 26 March, Quigley took on Freddy Lopez, who stepped in as a late replacement for Dante Moore. The fight was another quick finish for Quigley, with him targeting the body from the bell and scoring a knockdown in the first minute. Lopez stood back to his feet only for Quigley to continue the onslaught to his body. It wasn't long before Lopez was down again, giving Quigley another first-round knockout. The victory brought Quigley's record to 10–0, with 9 knockouts.

=== Quigley vs. Rosa ===
On 7 May, in just his 11th pro fight, Quigley took a major step up in class on the undercard of Saúl Álvarez vs. Amir Khan. Quigley faced the then 23-3 James de la Rosa of Mexico, who came in with two camps worth of preparation, having previously been scheduled to face David Lemieux in March. With Lemieux missing the contracted weight, their fight was scrapped and de la Rosa was instead booked to face Quigley in the Irishman's first 10-round fight. Despite Quigley previously going no further than 4 rounds, he passed his test with flying colors, using quick footwork, precise power punching, and disciplined boxing to hurt and outbox De la Rosa for a dominant and one-sided unanimous decision victory. All three judges scored the fight 100–90.

=== Quigley vs. Melendez ===
On 17 December 2016, Quigley fought on the undercard of Bernard Hopkins last fight against Joe Smith Jr. Quigley faced hard-punching Puerto Rican Jorge Melendez (30–7, 28 KO's). Melendez came out fast but Quigley was able to counter him and Melendez was dropped 3 times in the first round before his corner threw in the towel.

=== Quigley vs. Tapia ===
On 23 March 2017, Golden Boy had its first televised card on ESPN following their multi-year deal with the network. The main event featured Quigley taking on Glen Tapia, in what was Quigley's first time ever headlining a nationally televised boxing card. Quigley rocked Tapia badly with a right hand to the chin in the first round, and again with a right hand to the body in the second, but at some point in the second round, Quigley broke his right hand on a shot to the top of Tapia's head, which resulted in a torn tendon. From this point forward, Quigley could not be as effective with his right hand punches, and it became a fight of attrition. Quigley went back to boxing on the back foot and his superior technical skills earned him another wide unanimous decision (98–92, 99–91, 100–90).

=== Quigley vs. Mosley ===
On 29 May 2021, Quigley beat Shane Mosley Jr by majority decision in a 10-round contest. The scorecards were 95–95, 97–93, 96–94 in favor Quigley.

=== Quigley vs. Andrade ===
On 19 November 2021, Jason Quigley fought Demetrius Andrade for the WBO middleweight title in his first career title fight. Andrade won the fight by technical knockout in the 2nd round.

== Professional boxing record ==
23 fights	20 wins	3 losses
By knockout	14	2
By decision	6	1

No.	Result	Record	Opponent	Type	Round, time	Date	Location	Notes
23	Loss	20–3	(United States) Edgar Berlanga	UD	12	24 Jun 2023	(United States) Hulu Theater, New York City, New York, US	For NABO super middleweight title
22	Win	20–2	(Hungary) Gabor Gorbics	UD	10	1 Apr 2023	(Republic of Ireland) National Stadium, Dublin, Ireland	
21	Loss	19–2	(United States) Demetrius Andrade	TKO	2 (12), 2:24	19 Nov 2021	(United States) SNHU Arena, Manchester, New Hampshire, US	For WBO middleweight title
20	Win	19–1	(United States) Shane Mosley Jr.	MD	10	29 May 2021	(United States) Michelob Ultra Arena, Paradise, Nevada, US	Won vacant WBO–NABO middleweight title
19	Win	18–1	(Mexico) Fernando Marin	KO	3 (10), 1:47	23 Jan 2020	(United States) The Hangar, Costa Mesa, California, US	
18	Win	17–1	(Mexico) Abraham Cordero	KO	3 (8), 1:36	5 Dec 2019	(United States) The Hangar, Costa Mesa, California, US	
17	Loss	16–1	(The Bahamas) Tureano Johnson	RTD	9 (10), 3:00	18 Jul 2019	(United States) Fantasy Springs Resort Casino, Indio, California, US	Lost WBC-NABF middleweight title
16	Win	16–0	(Finland) Mathias Eklund	TKO	2 (8), 1:03	23 Mar 2019	(United Kingdom) Copper Box Arena, London, England	
15	Win	15–0	(Mexico) Freddy Hernandez	UD	10	18 Oct 2018	(United States) Fantasy Springs Resort Casino, Indio, California, US	Retained WBC-NABF middleweight title
14	Win	14–0	(Puerto Rico) Daniel Cruz	KO	6 (8), 2:51	31 Mar 2018	(United States) Marina Bay SportsPlex, Quincy, Massachusetts, US	
13	Win	13–0	(United States) Glen Tapia	UD	10	23 Mar 2017	(United States) Fantasy Springs Resort Casino, Indio, California, US	Won vacant WBC-NABF middleweight title
12	Win	12–0	(Puerto Rico) Jorge Melendez	KO	1 (10), 2:24	17 Dec 2016	(United States) The Forum, Inglewood, California, US	
11	Win	11–0	(Mexico) James de la Rosa	UD	10	7 May 2016	(United States) T-Mobile Arena, Paradise, Nevada, US	
10	Win	10–0	(Mexico) Freddy Lopez	KO	1 (8), 2:01	25 Mar 2016	(United States) Fantasy Springs Resort Casino, Indio, California, US	
9	Win	9–0	(United States) Marchristopher Adkins	UD	4	20 Nov 2015	(United States) Hard Rock Hotel and Casino, Las Vegas, Nevada, US	
8	Win	8–0	(United States) Michael Faulk	KO	2 (6), 2:59	8 Aug 2015	(United States) Fantasy Springs Resort Casino, Indio, California, US	
7	Win	7–0	(United States) Tom Howard	KO	2 (6), 1:21	11 Jul 2015	(United States) Los Angeles Memorial Sports Arena, Los Angeles, California, US	
6	Win	6–0	(United States) Joshua Snyder	TKO	2 (4), 0:44	30 Apr 2015	(United States) Fantasy Springs Resort Casino, Indio, California, US	
5	Win	5–0	(United States) Tolutomi Agunbiade	KO	2 (6), 1:41	20 Mar 2015	(United States) Fantasy Springs Resort Casino, Indio, California, US	
4	Win	4–0	(United States) Lanny Dardar	KO	1 (4), 1:34	6 Mar 2015	(United States) Belasco Theatre, Los Angeles, California, US	
3	Win	3–0	(United States) Greg McCoy	KO	1 (4), 2:39	30 Oct 2014	(United States) Memorial Hall, Plymouth, Massachusetts, US	
2	Win	2–0	(Mexico) Fernando Najera	RTD	3 (4), 3:00	16 Aug 2014	(United States) StubHub Center, Carson, California, US	
1	Win	1–0	(United States) Howard Reece	TKO	1 (6), 1:22	12 Jul 2014	(United States) MGM Grand Garden Arena, Paradise, Nevada, US	

== Gaelic games ==
Quigley also plays football and hurling with his local club Seán Mac Cumhaills.
