= Malaysia national amateur boxing athletes =

Malaysia National Boxing Federations

Malaysia Boxing Federations is Boxing Federations Of Malaysia, governed by the International Boxing Association (AIBA) and also Asian Boxing Council

Malaysia Boxing Federations also Organize Regional Tournament For Local Malaysian Boxer Below Articles Are Shown To Be Events That Organize in 2022 and Some Medalists Of These Events:

== 2022 Malaysian Boxing Championships Open Fight Kuala Lumpur ==
=== 2022 May Kuala Lumpur Malaysian Boxing Championships (MBC) ===
==== Tournament Medalists ====
- (U-15 Junior)

-Heavyweight

- Eddey Roger Anak Lakai ( Gold) Sarawak
- Muhammad Khairul Bin Azuan ( Silver)

Sabah

- Timothy Ng Jun Kai ( Bronze) Penang

-Middleweight

- Mohd Zamri Bin Baharudin (Gold) Selangor
- Feroz Bin Safuwan Rashid ( Silver) Johor
- Fergus Tan Chun Jiet (Bronze) Federal Territories of Malaysia

-Lightweight

- Muhammad Azfar Bin Abu Bakar (Gold) Perak
- Muhammad Ibrahim Bin Nazri ( Silver)

Terengganu

- Zigel Fernandes Anak Patrick ( Bronze)

Sarawak

- (U-17 Youth)

-Heavyweight

- Muhammad Aiman Bin Abu Bakar ( Gold) Selangor
- Muhammad Azfar Fikri (Silver)

Negeri Sembilan

- Gopalkrishnan Ramasamy a/l Thanabalan (Bronze) Penang

-Middleweight

- Mohd Azman Bin Abdulrahman (Gold) Selangor
- Muhd Aiman Azhar Bin Azrie ( Sarawak

-Lightweight

- Roger Wong Kai Jiek (Gold) Perak
- Enson Lau Yong Kit ( Silver)

Pahang

- Muhammad Aiman Bin Haqimi Rosli (Bronze) Kelantan
- (U-23 Senior)

-Heavyweight

- Muhammad Ashraf Bin Haqimi (Gold) Pahang
- Freddie George Anak Baring (Silver)

Sarawak

- Gary Cendang Anak Wilson (Bronze)

Sabah

-Middleweight

- Mohd Indra Bin Azhan (Gold) Selangor
- Wilson Ng Shih Hao (Silver)

Penang

- Mohd Zamzai Bin Nazrie (Bronze) Perak

-Lightweight

- Muhammad Haziq Bin Azfar (Gold) Perak
- Porstein Wang Po Wei (Silver)

Penang

- Luqman Bin Azhad (Bronze)

Selangor

== Sarawak Open Fight 2022 August Kuching ==
=== 2022 August Sarawak Open Fight Kuching ===
==== Tournament Medalists ====
-Heavyweight:

- Muhammad Ashraf Bin Haqimi (Gold) Pahang
- Christopher Ng Jun Hao (Silver)

Penang

- Gary Ferdinand (Bronze)

Sabah

-Bantamweight:

- Muhammad Faiq Bin Ar-Rashid (Gold) Selangor
- Mohd Hazim Bin Nasir (Silver)

Federal Territories Of Malaysia

- Mohd Zamri Fikri (Bronze) Perak

-Lightweight :

- Daniel Goh Xian Hao (Gold) Pahang
- Reddy Fernandes (Silver) Sabah
- Muhammad Taufik Bin Azmi (Bronze)

Johor

-Middleweight:

- Mohammad Hafiz Bin Rasid (Gold) Johor
- Maximillian Sew Hong Jiet (

-Featherweight:

- Muhammad Yusof (Gold) Kelantan
- Haziq Aiman Chai Kit Hao (Silver) Negeri Sembilan
- Ummareng Xavier (Bronze) Sabah

-Flyweight:

- Azizi Kamal Mohamad (Gold) Perlis
- Muhd Khairul Akhmal (Silver) Kelantan
- Zulkarnain Mustapha (Bronze) Penang
