= Kaewfah Tor Buamas =

Thai boxer

- Born: Krai Setthaphon (ไกร เสฏฐพล); 2 May 1986 (age 40); Roi Et province, Thailand
- Native name: แก้วฟ้า ต.บัวมาศ
- Other names: Nak chok na yok (นักชกหน้าหยก) "Jade-faced Puncher"; Sing sam-ang (สิงห์สำอาง) "Pretty Lion"; Kaewfah Suanpalm Farmnok (แก้วฟ้า สวนปาล์มฟาร์มนก) (sponsor name); Yutthapol Sudnongbua (ยุทธพล สุดหนองบัว) (birth name)
- Nationality: Thai
- Height: 1.73 m (5 ft 8 in)
- Weight: 126 lb (57 kg; 9.0 st); 130 lb (59 kg; 9.3 st); 135 lb (61 kg; 9.6 st); 140 lb (64 kg; 10 st)
- Fighting out of: Banklang Stadium, Pathum Thani
- Team: Tor Buamas
- Years active: 2009–present

Professional boxing record
- Total: 43
- Wins: 32
- By knockout: 22
- Losses: 11
- By knockout: 7
- Draws: 0
- No contests: 0

Other information
- University: Rajamangala University of Technology Phra Nakhon
- Boxing record from BoxRec

Krai Setthaphon (Thai: ไกร เสฏฐพล, born May 2, 1986) known professionally as Kaewfah Tor Buamas (แก้วฟ้า ต.บัวมาศ) is a Thai professional boxer.

== Biography & career ==
Tor Buamas was born in Roi Et province and later moved to Nakhon Sawan, where he grew up. He began boxing in childhood due to poverty, with his uncle serving as his first trainer. His first fight earned him about 80–100 baht in prize money.

He went on to compete as an amateur boxer in several tournaments, achieving success at the youth level before turning professional in 2009.

In mid-2017, he enrolled in a master's degree program at the Faculty of Business Administration, Rajamangala University of Technology Phra Nakhon.

On May 19, 2018, Tor Buamas challenged for the interim Asian Boxing Council (ABCO) Super Lightweight title against Atchariya Wirojanasunobol, a younger compatriot and former member of the Thailand national amateur boxing team. The fight took place at Workpoint Studio in Pathum Thani province. Tor lost by split decision after 10 rounds, with scores of 95–95, 97–93, and 97–93.

== Titles ==
Regional titles:

- Asian Boxing Council (ABCO)
  - Featherweight title (126 lbs) (2011)
  - Super featherweight interim title (130 lbs) (2013)
  - Lightweight title (135 lbs) (2015)
- WBA Asia
  - Super featherweight title (130 lbs) (2017)

== Professional boxing record ==
43 fights	32 wins	11 losses
By knockout	22	7
By decision	10	4

No.	Result	Record	Opponent	Type	Round, time	Date	Location	Notes
43	Loss	32–11	Jake Wyllie	KO	2 (8)	16 Sep 2023	The Famous Fortitude Stadium, Bowen Hills, Queensland, Australia	
42	Loss	32–10	Kenichi Ogawa	TKO	5 (10), 2:39	1 Apr 2023	Korakuen Hall, Tokyo, Japan	
41	Win	32–9	Younes Dehghanamirabadi	KO	1 (10), 2:59	30 Dec 2022	Khammouane Indoor Stadium, Khammouane, Laos	Retained ABF lightweight title
40	Win	31–9	Boido Simanjuntak	TKO	2 (10), 1:45	28 Oct 2022	Savan Itec-Mall, Savannakhet, Laos	Retained ABF lightweight title
39	Win	30–9	Atibet Sookdee	TKO	2 (6), 2:43	28 Aug 2022	Singmanassak Muaythai School, Pathum Thani, Thailand	
38	Loss	29–9	Katsuya Yasuda	TKO	6 (8), 0:11	12 Jul 2022	Korakuen Hall, Tokyo, Japan	
37	Loss	29–8	Apichet Petchmanee	UD	10	3 Apr 2021	Workpoint Studio, Bang Phun, Thailand	For WBC Asia lightweight title
36	Loss	29–7	Atchariya Wirojanasunobol	UD	10	26 Sep 2020	Suan Lum Night Bazaar Ratchadaphisek, Bangkok, Thailand	For WBA Asia South welterweight title
35	Loss	29–6	Alexander Devyatov	RTD	5 (8), 3:00	1 Feb 2020	Yantarny Sports Palace, Kaliningrad, Russia	
34	Loss	29–5	Jacob Ng	TKO	3 (10), 2:36	8 Nov 2019	Eatons Hill Hotel, Eatons Hill, Queensland, Australia	For vacant WBO Oriental lightweight title
33	Win	29–4	Leon Maratas	RTD	5 (10), 3:00	7 Aug 2019	Rajabhat Ubon Ratchatani University, Ubon Ratchathani, Thailand	Retianed ABF lightweight title
32	Win	28–4	Smile Brown	KO	4 (10) 0:48	31 Dec 2018	JF Boxing Stadium, Pattaya, Thailand	Retianed ABF lightweight title
31	Loss	27–4	Atchariya Wirojanasunobol	MD	10	19 May 2018	Workpoint Studio, Bang Phun, Thailand	
30	Win	27–3	Anthony Pangalila	RTD	5 (12), 3:00	27 Apr 2018	Northern Police Training Center, Hang Chat, Thailand	Won vacant ABF lightweight title
29	Win	26–3	Chaiyan Sakkoed	UD	6	17 Mar 2018	Bendigo Exhibition Centre, Bendigo, Australia	
28	Loss	25–3	George Kambosos Jr	TKO	9 (10), 1:59	13 Oct 2017	Melbourne Pavilion, Melbourne, Australia	For WBA Oceania and vacant IBF Pan Pacific lightweight titles
27	Win	25–2	Isack Junior	UD	12	19 May 2017	Wat Srisutharam School, Samut Sakhon, Thailand	Won vacant ABF lightweight title
26	Win	24–2	Thongchai Kunram	PTS	6	26 Apr 2017	Wat Samanrattanaram, Chachoengsao, Thailand	
25	Loss	23–2	Masayoshi Nakatani	UD	12	9 Apr 2017	Edion Arena, Osaka, Japan	For OPBF lightweight title
24	Loss	23–1	Czar Amonsot	TKO	7 (10), 1:37	25 Nov 2016	The Melbourne Pavilion, Melbourne, Australia	For WBA Oceania interim super-lightweight title
23	Win	23–0	Master Suro	KO	4 (6)	27 Jul 2016	North Eastern University, Khon Kaen, Thailand	
22	Win	22–0	Mong Na Jandee	TKO	4 (6)	31 May 2016	NCO Club Royal Thai Airforce, Bangkok, Thailand	
21	Win	21–0	Jason Butar Butar	TKO	6 (12), 2:11	11 Mar 2016	Provincial Gymnasium, Khon Kaen, Thailand	Won vacant WBA Asia lightweight title
20	Win	20–0	Andrew Wallace	UD	10	11 Sep 2015	Yu Hang Gymnasium, Hangzhou, China	Won vacant WBC Asia Continental lightweight title
19	Win	19–0	Rick Paciones	KO	3 (6)	9 Jul 2015	Sanamluang 2 Market, Bangkok, Thailand	
18	Win	18–0	Boido Simanjuntak	KO	4 (12)	20 Mar 2015	Suanpalm Farmnok, Chachoengsao, Thailand	Retianed WBC Asia super-featherweight title
17	Win	17–0	Oke Haryanto	KO	3 (12)	4 Sep 2014	Saksit Alloy Bangborn, Bangkok, Thailand	Retianed WBC Asia super-featherweight title
16	Win	16–0	Shi Shi Long	TKO	11 (12)	26 May 2014	Sanamluang 2 Market, Bangkok, Thailand	Won vacant WBC Asia super-featherweight title
15	Win	15–0	Andre Teixeira	UD	6	2 May 2014	Central Stadium, Ratchaburi, Thailand	
14	Win	14–0	Rafael Naffa	KO	2 (6)	27 Mar 2014	Pantainorasing Shrine, Samut Sakhon, Thailand	
13	Win	13–0	Jefferson Barbosa	TKO	2 (6)	3 Jan 2014	Suanpalm Farmnok, Chachoengsao, Thailand	
12	Win	12–0	Metaul Goldstar	PTS	6	8 Nov 2013	Sanamluang 2 Market, Bangkok, Thailand	
11	Win	11–0	Cristian Abila	UD	12	22 Apr 2013	Sanam Luang, Bangkok, Thailand	Won WBC Asia Continental interim super-featherweight title
10	Win	10–0	Pakphum Tor Pornchai	TKO	3 (6)	27 Feb 2013	Bangkokthonburi University, Bangkok, Thailand	
9	Win	9–0	Thongphun Photali	TKO	2 (6)	26 Dec 2012	Wat Samanrattanaram, Chachoengsao, Thailand	
8	Win	8–0	Eddy Safapio	TKO	4 (6)	30 Nov 2012	Wat Samanrattanaram, Chachoengsao, Thailand	
7	Win	7–0	Erawan Sithkongnapa	TKO	4 (6)	21 Aug 2012	Polytechnic College of Isan, Ubon Ratchathani, Thailand	
6	Win	6–0	Falazona Fidal	UD	12	30 May 2011	Chiang Rai, Thailand	Won vacant WBC Asia Continental featherweight title
5	Win	5–0	Lamnamkorn Kwanjaisrikod	PTS	6	3 Dec 2010	Klongchan Housing Complex Sport Stadium, Bangkok, Thailand	
4	Win	4–0	Somdej Manopkanchang	PTS	6	22 Oct 2010	Central Stadium, Phitsanulok, Thailand	
3	Win	3–0	Charlie Bugar	TKO	2 (6), 2:18	18 May 2010	Tapong Central Market, Rayong, Thailand	
2	Win	2–0	Teerasak Sithkaruehad	KO	3 (6)	27 Feb 2010	Bungkam, Bangkok, Thailand	
1	Win	1–0	Songkram Sithkorpon 1996	TKO	4 (6)	12 Nov 2009	Banklang Stadium, Pathum Thani, Thailand	
