= Azizbek Abdugofurov =

Uzbekistani boxer (born 1992)

Personal information
- Nickname: AAA
- Nationality: Uzbekistan
- Born: Азизбек Абдумухтар Угли Абдугофуров; 6 March 1992 (age 34) Qo‘rg‘ontepa, Andijan, Uzbekistan
- Height: 5 ft 10 in (178 cm)
- Weight: Middleweight; Super-middleweight

Boxing career

Boxing record
- Total fights: 15
- Wins: 14
- Win by KO: 5
- Losses: 1

Azizbek Abdugofurov (born 6 March 1992) is an Uzbekistani professional boxer who held the WBC Silver super-middleweight title from 2018 to March 2021. As an amateur, Abdugofurov represented Uzbekistan at the 2013 AIBA World Boxing Championships.

== Amateur career ==
Even though he was favoured to win the 2013 AIBA World Boxing Championships, he only was able to reach the quarter finals due to receiving a major cut against Artem Chebotarev. During the tournament, Abdugofurov defeated Aleksandar Drenovak.

== Professional boxing titles ==
- World Boxing Council
  - Asian Boxing Council middleweight title

== Professional boxing record ==
15 fights	14 wins	1 loss
By knockout	5	0
By decision	9	1

No.	Result	Record	Opponent	Type	Round, time	Date	Location	Notes
15	Win	14–1	Fedor Chudinov	UD	10	24 Apr 2022	Vegas City Hall, Krasnogorsk, Moscow Oblast	
14	Loss	13–1	Pavel Silyagin	UD	12	20 Mar 2021	Khodynka Ice Palace, Moscow, Russia	Lost WBC Silver super-middleweight title
13	Win	13–0	Gasan Gasanov	TKO	4 (10), 1:01	24 Aug 2019	Traktor Ice Arena, Chelyabinsk, Russia	
12	Win	12–0	Wuzhati Nuerlang	UD	12	18 Nov 2018	Philippine International Convention Center, Pasay, Philippines	Retained WBC Silver super-middleweight title
11	Win	11–0	Dmitry Chudinov	UD	12	5 May 2018	Sport Palace "Uzbekiston", Tashkent, Uzbekistan	Won vacant WBC Silver super-middleweight title
10	Win	10–0	Alfonso Tissen	UD	8	17 Mar 2018	One City Grand Ballroom, Subang Jaya, Malaysia	
9	Win	9–0	Yevgenii Makhteienko	UD	8	18 Nov 2017	Yoshlik, Khonabad, Uzbekistan	
8	Win	8–0	Tej Pratap Singh	SD	8	14 Oct 2017	Stadium Titwangsa, Kuala Lumpur, Malaysia	
7	Win	7–0	Jackson Malinyingi	UD	8	12 Aug 2017	Shamelin Shopping Mall, Kuala Lumpur, Malaysia	
6	Win	6–0	Martin Fidel Rios	UD	10	25 Mar 2017	OCBC Arena, Singapore	
5	Win	5–0	Sirimongkhon Iamthuam	UD	12	10 Feb 2017	Far East Square, Singapore	Retained WBC–ABCO middleweight title
4	Win	4–0	Aleksander Bajawa	RTD	2 (8), 3:00	7 Jan 2017	International Convention Center, Johor Bahru, Malaysia	
3	Win	3–0	Chaloemporn Sawatsuk	TKO	1 (12), 1:44	23 Jul 2016	Far East Square, Singapore	Won vacant WBC–ABCO middleweight title
2	Win	2-0	Sahlan Coral	TKO	2 (6), 2:03	10 Jun 2016	Futsing Association Commercial Building, Kallang, Singapore	
1	Win	1–0	Giga Nadiradze	TKO	5 (6)	17 May 2016	Sport Palace "Uzbekiston", Tashkent, Uzbekistan	

Sporting positions
Regional boxing titles
Vacant Title last held by Kerry Hope	WBC–ABCO middleweight champion 23 Jul 2016 – 2017; Vacated	Vacant Title last held by Pui Yu Lim
Vacant Title last held by Callum Smith	WBC Silver super-middleweight champion 5 May 2018 – 20 Mar 2021	Succeeded by Pavel Silyagin
