= Apichet Petchmanee =

Thai boxer (born 1989)

Personal information
- Nationality: Thai
- Born: 24 October 1989 (age 36) Surat Thani, Thailand
- Height: 175 cm (5 ft 9 in)
- Weight: Lightweight; Light-welterweight

Boxing career
- Stance: Orthodox

Boxing record
- Total fights: 17
- Wins: 16
- Win by KO: 5
- Losses: 2

Apichet Petchmanee (born 24 October 1989) is a Thai professional boxer who has held the WBC-ABC lightweight title since 2019.

== Professional boxing record ==
| 17 fights | 16 wins | 1 loss |
|---|---|---|
| By knockout | 5 | 0 |
| By decision | 11 | 1 |

| No. | Result | Record | Opponent | Type | Round, time | Date | Location | Notes |
|---|---|---|---|---|---|---|---|---|
| 16 | Win | 16–1 | Mark John Yap | UD | 10 | 30 Sep 2023 | Suan Lum Night Bazaar Ratchadaphisek, Bangkok, Thailand | Retained WBC-ABC lightweight title |
| 15 | Loss | 15–1 | Katsuya Yasuda | UD | 12 | 3 Jun 2023 | Korakuen Hall, Tokyo, Japan | For vacant WBO Asia Pacific super featherweight title |
| 15 | Win | 15–0 | Jilon Or.Pramuansak | UD | 8 | 25 Mar 2023 | Thupatemi Stadium, Pathum Thani, Thailand | |
| 14 | Win | 14–0 | Ernie Sanchez | UD | 10 | 26 Nov 2022 | Suan Lum Night Bazaar Ratchadaphisek, Bangkok, Thailand | Won vacant WBC-ABC lightweight title |
| 13 | Win | 13–0 | Natthaphon Promsri | TKO | 2 (6) | 24 Sep 2022 | Suan Lum Night Bazaar Ratchadaphisek, Bangkok, Thailand | |
| 12 | Win | 12–0 | Chattarin Pengwuek | TKO | 5 (6) | 30 Jul 2022 | Suan Lum Night Bazaar Ratchadaphisek, Bangkok, Thailand | |
| 11 | Win | 11–0 | Phuttiphong Rakoon | KO | 2 (8), 2:05 | 2 Oct 2021 | Khao Kradong Stadium, Buriram, Thailand | |
| 10 | Win | 10–0 | Phumiritdet Chonlathondamrongkun | UD | 10 | 20 Aug 2021 | Conrad Dubai, Dubai, United Arab Emirates | Retained WBC-ABC lightweight title |
| 9 | Win | 9–0 | Kaewfah Tor Buamas | UD | 10 | 3 Apr 2021 | Workpoint Studio, Bang Phun, Thailand | Retained WBC-ABC lightweight title |
| 8 | Win | 8–0 | Musheg Adoian | UD | 8 | 5 Dec 2020 | Workpoint Studio, Bang Phun, Thailand | Retained WBC-ABC lightweight title |
| 7 | Win | 7–0 | Musheg Adoian | MD | 8 | 3 Oct 2020 | Workpoint Studio, Bang Phun, Thailand | Retained WBC-ABC lightweight title |
| 6 | Win | 6–0 | Ari Agustian | UD | 8 | 21 Dec 2019 | Workpoint Studio, Bang Phun, Thailand | |
| 5 | Win | 5–0 | Chonlatarn Piriyapinyo | UD | 10 | 17 Aug 2019 | Workpoint Studio, Bang Phun, Thailand | Won vacant WBC-ABC lightweight title |
| 4 | Win | 4–0 | Chonlatarn Piriyapinyo | UD | 8 | 22 Jun 2019 | Workpoint Studio, Bang Phun, Thailand | |
| 3 | Win | 3–0 | Shota Suito | UD | 10 | 23 Mar 2019 | Workpoint Studio, Bang Phun, Thailand | Won vacant WBC-ABC Silver lightweight title |
| 2 | Win | 2–0 | Sadudee Srimueang | TKO | 2 (10), 1:36 | 22 Dec 2018 | Workpoint Studio, Bang Phun, Thailand | Won vacant WBC-OPBF Silver super-lightweight title |
| 1 | Win | 1–0 | Attanon Kunlawong | TKO | 2 (6), 2:59 | 20 Oct 2018 | Workpoint Studio, Bang Phun, Thailand | |
