= Anthony Fowler =

English boxer (born 1991)

Personal information
- Nickname: The Machine
- Born: Anthony John Fowler; 10 March 1991 (age 35) Liverpool, England
- Height: 5 ft 11 in (180 cm)
- Weight: Light-middleweight; Middleweight

Boxing career
- Reach: 71 in (180 cm)
- Stance: Orthodox

Boxing record
- Total fights: 18
- Wins: 16
- Win by KO: 12
- Losses: 2
Medal record
Men's amateur boxing
Representing England
World Championships
Bronze medal – third place	2013 Almaty	Middleweight
Commonwealth Games
Gold medal – first place	2014 Glasgow	Middleweight

Anthony John Fowler (born 10 March 1991) is a British former professional boxer. As an amateur, he won a bronze medal at the 2013 World Championships and gold at the 2014 Commonwealth Games.

== Amateur career ==
Fowler competed at the 2013 World Championships. He won four fights including beating 2nd seed Dmytro Mytrafanov and 7th seed Stefan Härtel, winning the bronze medal along with Artem Chebotarev of Russia.

Fowler entered the 2014 Commonwealth Games Middleweight boxing competition at the round of 32, beating Cypriot Kyriakos Spanosby unanimous decision. Fowler continued to the final, defeating Kieran Smith in the round of 16, Nickson Otieno Abaka in the quarter-final, and Benny Muziyo in the semi-final, all by unanimous decision. Fowler claimed gold in the competition on 2 August 2014, defeating Indian Vijender Singh by unanimous decision.

Fowler competed for the British Lionhearts squad at the 2015 World Series of Boxing competition.

Fowler fought Asian Games quarter-finalist Zhou Di of the China Dragons in York Hall, Bethnal Green London, on 15 January 2015. Fowler comfortably controlled the opening two rounds, however in the third round the fight took a dramatic turn when a clash of heads left Fowler with a gaping cut to the forehead, forcing the referee to stop the fight.

On 30 January 2015 Fowler fought again on behalf of the British Lionhearts to face Moroccan Atlas Lions middleweight contender, Said Harnouf. Fowler dominated the first two rounds of the fight knocking his opponent down to the canvas three times. During the second round a cut Fowler sustained two weeks earlier was re-opened though the referee allowed the fight to continue. From here Fowler clearly changed strategy in order to protect the cut in order to finish the fight. Despite this setback Fowler continued to challenge his opponent and was declared the unanimous victor at the end of the five fight bout.

On 26 February Fowler went on to win his fight for the British Lionhearts against his opponent Misael Rodriguez (fight for the Mexican Guerreros) by split decision to continue his winning streak in the 2015 World Series of Boxing.

Fowler competed at the 2016 Summer Olympics in Brazil but lost in his opening fight to Janibek Alimkhanuly of Kazakhstan by unanimous decision having suffered a knockdown in round two.

Fowler finished his amateur career in 2016 with a record of 190–19.

== Professional career ==
=== Early career ===
Fowler made his professional debut on 27 May 2017 at Bramall Lane in Sheffield, on the undercard of Kell Brook vs. Errol Spence Jr., scoring a first-round knockout over Arturs Geikins.

=== Fowler vs. Fitzgerald ===
Fowler suffered his first defeat at the hands of Scott Fitzgerald via split decision. The bout took place on 30 March 2019 at the Echo Arena in Liverpool.

=== Fowler vs. Harper ===
On 7 August 2020, Fowler fought and defeated Adam Harper via a seventh round technical knockout.

=== Fowler vs. Fortea ===
On 20 March 2021, Fowler fought IBF #15 ranked Jorge Fortea. Fowler won the fight via knockout in three rounds.

=== Fowler vs. Smith ===
On 9 October 2021, Fowler was beaten by fellow Liverpudlian, Liam Smith, suffering an eighth round technical knockout loss.

=== Retirement ===
Having not fought since 27 February 2022, Fowler officially announced his retirement from boxing via social media on 5 June 2023.

== Investigation ==
Fowler has been probed by Britain's Advertising Standards Authority for misconduct while promoting and advertising his company Supreme CBD. Fowler along with other celebrities including, Paul Merson, Matt Le Tissier, and John Hartson have all been investigated and issued with a warning by the ASA. The ASA investigation concluded that their social media posts have been found to be commercial in nature, and not "honest" opinions about the benefits of CBD, since they were being financially rewarded for their posts. The investigation also concluded that the posts made by these celebrities were making unlawful medical claims about the use of CBD, which is prohibited by the UK's Medicines & Healthcare products Regulatory Agency.

== Personal life ==
Fowler is a first cousin of former Liverpool F.C. and England footballer Robbie Fowler. After the 2024 Southport stabbings, Fowler spread misinformation on Twitter about the attacker being "a fellow from Syria".

== Professional boxing record ==
18 fights	16 wins	2 losses
By knockout	12	1
By decision	4	1

No.	Result	Record	Opponent	Type	Round, time	Date	Location	Notes
18	Win	16–2	Lukasz Maciec	UD	10	27 Feb 2022	The O2 Arena, London, England	
17	Loss	15–2	Liam Smith	TKO	8 (12), 0:20	9 Oct 2021	M&S Bank Arena, Liverpool, England	Lost WBA International super-welterweight title
16	Win	15–1	Rico Mueller	TKO	8 (10), 2:12	31 Jul 2021	Matchroom Headquarters, Brentwood, England	
15	Win	14–1	Jorge Fortea	KO	3 (10), 3:00	20 Mar 2021	The SSE Arena, London, England	Retained WBA International super-welterweight title
14	Win	13–1	Adam Harper	TKO	7 (10), 1:34	7 Aug 2020	Matchroom Fight Camp, Brentwood, England	
13	Win	12–1	Theophilus Tetteh	TKO	1 (10), 3:00	7 Mar 2020	Manchester Arena, Manchester, England	
12	Win	11–1	Harry Scarff	UD	10	23 Nov 2019	Echo Arena, Liverpool, England	Won vacant WBA International super-welterweight title
11	Win	10–1	Brian Rose	UD	10	2 Aug 2019	Exhibition Centre, Liverpool, England	Won vacant WBO Inter-Continental middleweight title
10	Loss	9–1	Scott Fitzgerald	SD	10	30 Mar 2019	Echo Arena, Liverpool, England	For vacant WBA International super-welterweight title
9	Win	9–0	Jose Carlos Paz	KO	1 (10), 1:33	8 Dec 2018	Sheffield Arena, Sheffield, England	
8	Win	8–0	Gabor Gorbics	TKO	5 (8), 0:45	13 Oct 2018	Metro Radio Arena, Newcastle, England	
7	Win	7–0	Craig O'Brien	KO	6 (8), 0:08	28 Jul 2018	The O2 Arena, London, England	
6	Win	6–0	Ryan Toms	KO	2 (8), 2:49	21 Apr 2018	Echo Arena, Liverpool, England	
5	Win	5–0	Kalilou Dembele	TKO	5 (6), 0:22	24 Mar 2018	The O2 Arena, London, England	
4	Win	4–0	Laszlo Fazekas	PTS	6	21 Oct 2017	SSE Arena, Belfast, Northern Ireland	
3	Win	3–0	Jay Byrne	TKO	4 (6), 1:56	30 Sep 2017	Echo Arena, Liverpool, England	
2	Win	2–0	Nikoloz Gvajava	TKO	4 (6), 0:26	23 Jun 2017	Walker Activity Dome, Newcastle, England	
1	Win	1–0	Arturs Geikins	TKO	1 (4), 2:59	27 May 2017	Bramall Lane, Sheffield, England	
