= Devin Haney vs. Jorge Linares =

2021 boxing match

- Date: May 29, 2021
- Venue: Michelob Ultra Arena, Las Vegas, Nevada, U.S.
- Title(s) on the line: WBC lightweight title

Tale of the tape
Boxer	Devin Haney	Jorge Linares
Nickname	"The Dream"	"El Nino"
Hometown	San Francisco, California, U.S.	Barinas, Venezuela
Pre-fight record	25–0 (15 KO)	47–5 (29 KO)
Age	22 years, 6 months	35 years, 9 months
Height	5 ft 8 in (173 cm)	5 ft 8 in (173 cm)
Weight	135 lb (61 kg)	134 lb (61 kg)
Style	Orthodox	Orthodox
Recognition	WBC; Lightweight Champion; The Ring/TBRB; No. 3 Ranked Lightweight	WBC; No. 3 Ranked Lightweight; The Ring; No. 7 Ranked Lightweight; 3-division world champion

Result
- Haney wins via unanimous decision (116-112, 116-112, 115-113)

Devin Haney vs. Jorge Linares was a professional boxing match contested on May 29, 2021, for the WBC lightweight championship. The bout took place at the Michelob Ultra Arena in Las Vegas, Nevada, US.

== Background ==
After Haney's unanimous decision win over Cuban veteran Yuriorkis Gamboa, Haney called out fellow American lightweight and newly crowned unified lightweight world champion, Teófimo López, who had recently defeated pound-for-pound star Vasiliy Lomachenko three weeks prior, saying it was 'the main fight' he wanted to make happen. However, the IBF mandated López to fight Australian George Kambosos Jr, with López deciding to go in that direction to minimize the risk of being stripped of his title.

In January 2021, after Ryan Garcia captured the WBC interim lightweight title after his seventh-round stoppage over Luke Campbell, the WBC were set to order Haney to defend his title against García. However, García seemed to show little interest in a potential fight with Haney, and voiced his desire to face Gervonta Davis or Manny Pacquiao instead, ultimately fighting neither in the end.

After weeks of negotiations, it was announced that Haney was set to defend his WBC title against former three-division world champion Jorge Linares on May 29, 2021 in Las Vegas.

== The fight ==
Haney controlled the action for most of the fight, but was hurt when Linares caught him with a powerful right-left combination toward the end of the tenth round. Haney survived the final two rounds largely by tying Linares up and negating his opponent's attempts at trying to engage with him.

The crowd voiced their displeasure with what they perceived as excessive clinching by booing Haney when he jumped up on the ropes in celebration immediately after the final bell, as well as booing during the announcement of the official decision.

Haney won by unanimous decision with the judges scoring the bout 116-112, 116-112, 115-113 in his favor.

== Fight card ==
Confirmed bouts:

Weight Class		vs.		Method	Round	Time	Notes
Lightweight	(United States) Devin Haney (c)	def.	(Venezuela) Jorge Linares	UD	12/12		^{Note 1}
Super lightweight	(United Kingdom) Chantelle Cameron (c)	def.	(Puerto Rico) Melissa Hernandez	TKO	5/10	1:25	^{Note 2}
Super featherweight	(South Africa) Azinga Fuzile	def.	(United Kingdom) Martin Joseph Ward	TKO	7/12	2:45
Middleweight	(Republic of Ireland) Jason Quigley	def.	(United States) Shane Mosley Jr.	MD	10/10
Welterweight	(Albania) Reshat Mati	def.	(Puerto Rico) Ryan Pino	UD	6/6
Featherweight	(Somalia) Ramla Ali	def.	(United States) Mikayla Nepel	UD	6/6
Light heavyweight	(United States) Khalil Coe	def.	(United States) Nathaniel Tadd	TKO	2/4	1:10
Super welterweight	(United States) Amari Jones	def.	(United States) Jonathan Ryan Burrs	KO	1/4	2:56

^Note 1 For WBC lightweight title
^Note 2 For WBC female super lightweight title

Preceded by vs. Yuriorkis Gamboa	Devin Haney's bouts 29 May 2021	Succeeded by vs. Joseph Diaz Jr.
Preceded by vs. Carlos Morales	Jorge Linares's bouts 29 May 2021	Succeeded by vs. Zaur Abdullaev
