= Vincenzo Gualtieri =

German and Italian boxer (born 1993)

Personal information
- Nickname: Il Capo ("The Boss")
- Nationality: German; Italian
- Born: 4 January 1993 (age 33) Wuppertal, Germany
- Height: 5 ft 10 1/2 in (179 cm)
- Weight: Middleweight

Boxing career
- Stance: Orthodox

Boxing record
- Total fights: 29
- Wins: 26
- Win by KO: 9
- Losses: 2
- Draws: 1

Vincenzo Gualtieri (born 4 January 1993) is a German-Italian professional boxer. He held the International Boxing Federation (IBF) middleweight title in 2023.

== Professional career ==
Gualtieri turned professional in 2015 and compiled a record of 20–0–1 before defeating Esquiva Falcão to win the vacant IBF middleweight world title. He made his first defense on October 14, 2023, against WBO champion Janibek Alimkhanuly. By the third round, Gualtieri was badly cut over his brow, and was then stunned by a left uppercut in the fifth round. Despite recovering from this blow, he was stunned again by another left uppercut in the sixth round, and despite staying on his feet, the referee saw he was too badly hurt to continue and stopped the fight, awarding the TKO and Gualtieri's title to Alimkhanuly. This was the first loss of Gualtieri's career. In a post-fight interview, Gualtieri maintained that the stoppage was too early, but he remained gracious and acknowledged Alimkhanuly's victory, pointing to the injuries on his face as evidence of Alimkhanuly's dominance.

On 15 February 2025, he defeated Alexander Pavlov by unanimous decision for the second time in a 12 round fight at Sparkassen-Arena in Bayern, Germany, to win the WBO European middleweight title.

Gualtieri faced Amari Jones at SAP Center in San Jose, California, USA, on 22 May 2026, losing by knockout in the third round.

== Professional boxing record ==
28 fights	26 wins	1 loss
By knockout	9	1
By decision	17	0
Draws	1	

No.	Result	Record	Opponent	Type	Round, time	Date	Location	Notes
29	Win	26–2–1	Aliaksandr Dzemka	TKO	1 (6)	5 Nov 2026	Trui Teatre, Palma de Mallorca, Spain	
28	Loss	25–2–1	Amari Jones	KO	3 (12), 2:29	22 May 2026	SAP Center, San Jose, California, U.S.	
27	Win	25–1–1	Attila Koros	UD	6	17 Jan 2026	Sparkassen-Arena, Bayern, Germany	
26	Win	24–1–1	Alexander Pavlov	UD	12	15 Feb 2025	ratiopharm Arena, Neu-Ulm, Germany	Won WBO European middleweight title
25	Win	23–1–1	Job Ezequiel Herrera	KO	1 (8), 2:00	19 Oct 2024	Stadthalle, Falkensee, Germany	
24	Win	22–1–1	Joshua Nmomah	UD	8	13 Apr 2024	AGON Sportpark, Charlottenburg, Germany	
23	Loss	21–1–1	Janibek Alimkhanuly	TKO	6 (12), 1:25	14 Oct 2023	Fort Bend Epicenter, Rosenberg, Texas, US	Lost IBF middleweight title; For WBO middleweight title
22	Win	21–0–1	Esquiva Falcão	UD	12	1 Jul 2023	Uni-Halle, Wuppertal, Germany	Won vacant IBF middleweight title
21	Win	20–0–1	Vincenzo Bevilacqua	UD	12	10 Sep 2022	Uni-Halle, Wuppertal, Germany	Retained IBF Inter-Continental middleweight title
20	Win	19–0–1	Dario Socci	UD	12	11 Mar 2022	AGON Sportpark, Charlottenburg, Germany	Retained IBF Inter-Continental middleweight title
19	Win	18–0–1	Billi Facundo Godoy	UD	12	26 Nov 2021	AGON Sportpark, Charlottenburg, Germany	Won vacant IBF Inter-Continental middleweight title
18	Win	17–0–1	Khalil El Harraz	UD	12	28 May 2021	AGON Sportpark, Charlottenburg, Germany	Retained IBO Continental middleweight title
17	Win	16–0–1	Sofiane Khati	UD	12	27 Feb 2021	AGON Sportpark, Charlottenburg, Germany	Won vacant IBO Continental middleweight title
16	Draw	15–0–1	Thomas Piccirillo	MD	10	28 Aug 2020	Havelstudios, Charlottenburg, Germany	Retained German middleweight title
15	Win	15–0	Alexander Pavlov	MD	10	12 Jun 2020	Havelstudios, Charlottenburg, Germany	Won vacant German middleweight title
14	Win	14–0	Giorgi Ungiadze	UD	8	23 Nov 2019	Treptow Arena, Treptow, Germany	
13	Win	13–0	Valentyn Kuts	TKO	3 (8), 0:30	21 Sep 2019	Sporthalle, Zinnowitz, Germany	
12	Win	12–0	Viktar Murashkin	UD	8	15 Jun 2019	Sport- und Kongresshalle, Schwerin, Germany	
11	Win	11–0	George Aduashvili	RTD	3 (8), 3:00	23 Mar 2019	Sporthalle, Dorf Mecklenburg, Germany	
10	Win	10–0	Benjamin Skender	TKO	3 (8), 2:31	22 Dec 2018	Challenge Club Arena, Offenbach, Germany	
9	Win	9–0	Azad Dogru	KO	1 (6), 2:59	3 Mar 2018	Sportpark am Hallo, Essen, Germany	
8	Win	8–0	Serhii Ksendzov	UD	4	25 Mar 2017	MBS Arena, Potsdam, Germany	
7	Win	7–0	Renat Samedov	KO	7 (10), 2:50	9 Jul 2016	Sternberg, Mitte, Germany	Won GBA International middleweight title
6	Win	6–0	Cheikh Fall	UD	6	28 May 2016	Saalbau, Frankfurt, Germany	
5	Win	5–0	Patrick Mittag	UD	6	30 Apr 2016	Schuetzenhalle, Buchholz, Germany	
4	Win	4–0	Gyula Nagy	RTD	5 (6), 3:00	5 Mar 2016	Boxsporthalle Braamkamp, Winterhude, Germany	
3	Win	3–0	Norbert Szekeres	PTS	6	30 Jan 2016	Huxleys, Kreuzberg, Germany	
2	Win	2–0	Alexandros Filippides	PTS	4	11 Dec 2015	Boxtempel, Weissensee, Germany	
1	Win	1–0	Oskar Jerzy Borkowski	TKO	2 (4), 1:17	31 Oct 2015	Universum Gym, Lohbruegge, Germany	

== See also ==
- List of male boxers
- List of world middleweight boxing champions

Sporting positions
Regional boxing titles
Vacant Title last held by Ibrahim Guemues	GBA International middleweight champion 9 July 2016 – 2018; Vacated	Vacant Title next held by Thomas Piccirillo
Vacant Title last held by Bjoern Schicke	German middleweight champion 12 June 2020 – 2021; Vacated	Vacant Title next held by Thomas Piccirillo
Vacant Title last held by Zeynel Elbir	IBO Continental middleweight champion February 27, 2021 – 2022; Vacated	Vacant Title next held by Paul Kean
Vacant Title last held by Vincent Feigenbutz	IBF Inter-Continental middleweight champion November 26, 2021 – 1 July 2023; Won world title	Vacant Title next held by Thomas Piccirillo
World boxing titles
Vacant Title last held by Gennady Golovkin	IBF middleweight champion 1 July 2023 – 14 October 2023	Succeeded by Janibek Alimkhanuly
