= Floyd Mayweather Jr. vs. Logan Paul =

2021 exhibition crossover boxing match

Bragging Rights
- Date: June 6, 2021
- Venue: Hard Rock Stadium, Miami Gardens, Florida, U.S.
- Title(s) on the line: WBC (Bragging Rights) catchweight title

Tale of the tape
Boxer	Floyd Mayweather Jr.	Logan Paul
Nickname	Money	The Maverick
Hometown	Grand Rapids, Michigan, U.S.	Westlake, Ohio, U.S.
Purse	$10,000,000	$250,000
Pre-fight record	50–0 (27 KOs)	0–1–1
Age	44 years, 3 months	26 years, 2 months
Height	5 ft 8 in (173 cm)	6 ft 2 in (188 cm)
Weight	155 lb (70 kg)	189 1/2 lb (86.0 kg)
Style	Orthodox	Orthodox
Recognition	5-division world champion	

Result
- Non-scored bout

Floyd Mayweather Jr. vs. Logan Paul, billed as "Bragging Rights", was an exhibition crossover boxing match between former five-division world champion Floyd Mayweather Jr. and YouTuber Logan Paul. It took place on June 6, 2021, at the Hard Rock Stadium in Miami Gardens, Florida and was sanctioned by the Florida State Athletic Commission (FSAC) with former WBC world champions acting as judges. The fight reportedly sold over 1 million PPV buys, and generated over $80 million in revenue.

== Background ==
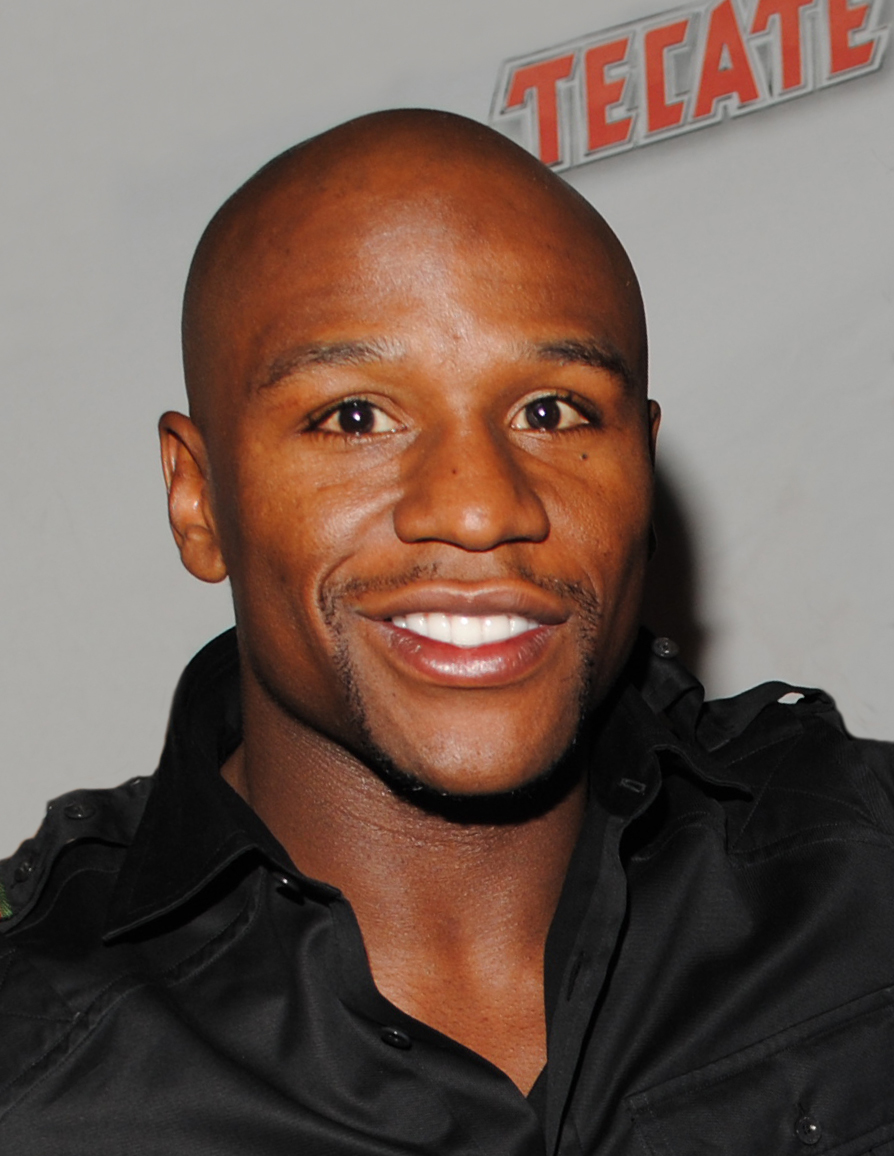
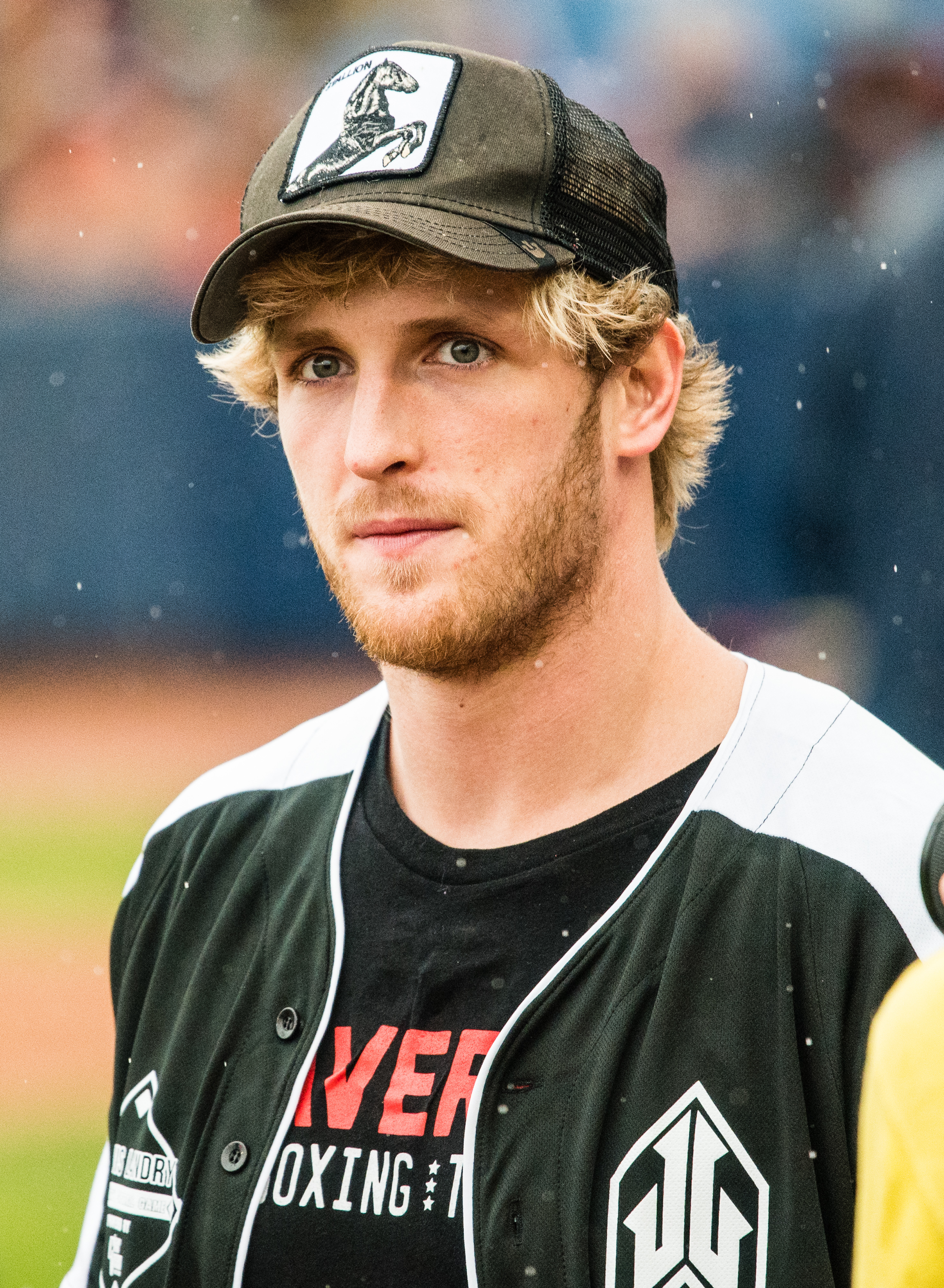
Floyd Mayweather Jr. (left) and Logan Paul (right).

On December 6, 2020, Paul and Mayweather agreed to fight in an exhibition bout on February 20, 2021. The fight was postponed to June 6, 2021 and took place at Hard Rock Stadium in Miami Gardens, Florida.

On April 27, 2021, Badou Jack and Jean Pascal were added to the card. However, on May 29, 2021, Jean Pascal failed a drug test and was removed from the bout. On June 1, 2021, Dervin Colina replaced Jean Pascal to face Badou Jack. On May 3, 2021, a fight between former NFL wide receiver Chad Johnson and Brian Maxwell was also added to the card.

== Fight card ==
Weight Class		vs.		Method	Round	Time	Notes
Catchweight	(United States) Logan Paul		(United States) Floyd Mayweather Jr.		8	3:00	Exhibition bout; Scored by the WBC
Light heavyweight	(Sweden) Badou Jack	def.	(Venezuela) Dervin Colina	TKO	4 (10)	2:46
Middleweight	(United States) Luís Arias	def.	(United States) Jarrett Hurd	SD	10	3:00
Cruiserweight	(United States) Chad Johnson	vs.	(United States) Brian Maxwell	N/A	4	2:00	Exhibition bout; Non-scored bout; No winner was declared

== Fight details ==
=== Mayweather vs. Paul (main event) ===
Mayweather started tentatively and defensively, reluctant to throw often and avoiding most of Paul's shots. Toward the end of the first round, Paul unleashed a wild flurry, but all of his punches were blocked by Mayweather's guard. The second round was similar to the first, with Mayweather content with the slow pace of the fight. He finally turned up the offense in the third, opening up with some clean left hooks that rocked Paul's head back, as well as mixing in his trademark pull counter with the right hand. From the fourth round onward, Paul was visibly fatigued and took every opportunity to utilize his weight advantage by tying the smaller Mayweather up in the clinch after every exchange. Despite Paul's constant attempts at neutering Mayweather's offense, the latter continued to dictate the pace of the fight and land the cleaner, more effective punches. Toward the end of the eighth and final round, Paul showboated when it became clear that he had done enough to avoid being stopped as most had predicted would be the case, and that he would survive to hear the final bell.

The fight went the full eight-round distance, and no winner was announced. Mayweather's superior boxing was reflected by the CompuBox punch stats, with Mayweather having landed 43 punches of 107 thrown (40.2%), compared to Paul's 28 landed of 217 thrown (12.9%).

In his post-fight interview, Mayweather praised his opponent, saying: "He's better than I thought he was ... he's a tough, rough competitor." Paul appeared to harbor some doubt about how seriously Mayweather had taken the fight, saying: "I'm going to go home thinking, 'Did Floyd let me survive?'" Mayweather later stated that he did hold back, saying "If it was a real fight, it would've been a blowout in the first round."

=== Undercard ===
On the undercard, former two-division champion Badou Jack beat undefeated Dervin Colina by fourth-round technical knockout, Luís Arias secured an upset victory against former unified light-middleweight champion Jarrett Hurd via split decision, and Chad Johnson and Brian Maxwell went the full distance in a four-round exhibition bout.

== Broadcasting ==
In the United Kingdom and Ireland, the undercard was televised on Sky Sports Action, Sky Sports Mix, Sky Sports Main Event, Sky One and Sky Sports Boxing YouTube, whereas the main card aired on Sky Sports Box Office.

ESPN broadcast the fight across Latin America, with former world boxing champions Marcos Maidana and Acelino Freitas as guest analysts in the Spanish and Portuguese broadcasts respectively.

The fight was televised on Showtime PPV (and free to Showtime's subscribers) in the United States, and globally on Fanmio PPV at Fanmio.com. In Australia, the fight was televised on Main Event. In New Zealand, the fight was televised on Sky Arena. In South Africa, the fight was televised on SuperSport. In Russia, the fight was televised on REN TV. In Poland, the fight was televised on TVP Sport. In Portugal, the fight was televised on Sport TV. In the Czech Republic, the fight was televised on Sport 2. In Turkey, the fight was televised on S Sport Plus. In Spain, the fight was televised on Mitele Plus. In Indonesia, the fight was televised on tvOne. In Malaysia, the fight was televised on Astro Box Office.

Country	Broadcaster			
Country	Free-to-air	Cable/Pay TV	PPV	Stream
United Kingdom	Sky Sports Boxing YouTube, Sky Sports Mix (undercard)	Sky Sports Action, Sky Sports Main Event, Sky One (undercard)	Sky Sports Box Office (main card)	
Ireland	Sky Sports Boxing YouTube, Sky Sports Mix (undercard)	Sky Sports Action, Sky Sports Main Event, Sky One (undercard)	Sky Sports Box Office (main card)	
United States	—N/a		Fanmio PPV (Fanmio.com), Showtime PPV	Fanmio PPV (Fanmio.com)
Australia	—N/a	—N/a	Main Event	—N/a
New Zealand	—N/a	—N/a	Sky Arena	—N/a
South Africa	—N/a	SuperSport	—N/a	—N/a
Russia	REN TV	—N/a	—N/a	—N/a
Poland	—N/a	TVP Sport	—N/a	—N/a
Portugal	—N/a	Sport TV	—N/a	—N/a
Czech Republic	—N/a	Sport 2	—N/a	—N/a
Turkey	—N/a	S Sport Plus	—N/a	—N/a
Spain	—N/a	—N/a	—N/a	Mitele Plus
Indonesia	tvOne	—N/a		tvOne
Malaysia	—N/a		Astro Box Office	—N/a
Thailand	—N/a	Fight Sports	—N/a	
Latin America	—N/a	ESPN	—N/a	ESPN
Worldwide	—N/a		Fanmio PPV (Fanmio.com)	Fanmio PPV (Fanmio.com)

== See also ==
- Freak show fight
- Jake Paul vs. Mike Tyson
