= Jacob Ng =

Australian boxer

Personal information
- Nickname: The Flamingo
- Nationality: Australian
- Born: 20 November 1994 (age 31) Gold Coast, Queensland, Australia
- Height: 5 ft 11 1/2 in (1.82 m)
- Weight: Lightweight

Boxing career
- Reach: 71 1/2 in (182 cm)
- Stance: Orthodox

Boxing record
- Total fights: 16
- Wins: 15
- Win by KO: 11
- Losses: 1

Jacob Ng (born 20 November 1994) is an Australian professional boxer who has held the WBO Oriental and IBF International lightweight titles since 2019.

== Early years ==
Ng was born on 20 November 1994 on the Gold Coast in Queensland. His father, Stephen, was a successful amateur boxer who also held the Queensland State middleweight title as a pro. Ng spent much of his childhood at his father's gym, Matrix Boxing Gym, initially taking up Brazilian jiu-jitsu at the age of ten. He competed in the sport nationally and internationally until the age of 18, becoming a blue belt with four tips.

Ng began boxing at the age of 15 and won a state amateur title before he started getting into trouble and partying. His dad sent him to Thailand for a year to compete in Muay Thai, where he compiled a professional record of 8–0–1 (8 KO).

== Professional career ==
Ng made his professional boxing debut on 24 June 2017, defeating Sam Williams via a fourth-round technical knockout (TKO) in Eatons Hill, Queensland. He went on a winning streak and closed out 2018 by winning the Queensland State and Australian lightweight titles with back-to-back TKO's of Mark Ramirez and Gaige Ireland, respectively. On 16 March 2019, Ng stopped Filipino prospect Glenn Enterino (14–4–1, 9 KO) in the sixth round for the vacant IBF Youth lightweight title. Three months later, he won his fourth title in four fights when he defeated Mexican rival Ricardo Lara (19–5, 9 KO) by unanimous decision (UD) for the vacant IBF International lightweight title, moving him into the top 15 of the IBF rankings. He successfully defended the belt in September, dropping Spanish contender Pablo Fuego (15–4, 2 KO) three times en route to a fifth-round TKO finish.

On 8 November 2019, Ng faced Kaewfah Tor Buamas for the vacant WBO Oriental lightweight title. He won the belt with a third-round TKO victory. Now ranked #11 in both the IBF and WBO rankings, Ng was scheduled to defend both his IBF International and WBO Oriental titles against Japanese veteran Valentine Hosokawa (25–7–3, 12 KO) in March 2020. However, the undefeated Australian pulled out due to injury and the bout was further postponed due to the COVID-19 pandemic.

== Professional boxing record ==
16 fights	15 wins	1 loss
By knockout	11	0
By decision	4	0
By disqualification	0	1

No.	Result	Record	Opponent	Type	Round, time	Date	Location	Notes
16	Loss	15–1	(Australia) Billy Dib	DQ	6 (10), 2:32	19 Mar 2022	The Star Gold Coast, Broadbeach, Australia	Lost IBF International lightweight title and WBO Oriental lightweight title
15	Win	15–0	(Australia) Blake Minto	UD	10	27 Mar 2021	Eatons Hill Hotel, Eatons Hill, Queensland, Australia	
14	Win	14–0	(Australia) Hunter Ioane	TKO	5 (10), 1:20	11 Dec 2020	Exhibition Park, Canberra, ACT, Australia	Retained IBF International and WBO Oriental lightweight titles
13	Win	13–0	(Thailand) Kaewfah Tor Buamas	TKO	3 (10), 2:36	8 Nov 2019	Eatons Hill Hotel, Eatons Hill, Queensland, Australia	Won vacant WBO Oriental lightweight title
12	Win	12–0	(Spain) Pablo Fuego	TKO	5 (10), 2:06	21 Sep 2019	Southport Sharks AFL Club, Gold Coast, Queensland, Australia	Retained IBF International lightweight title
11	Win	11–0	(Mexico) Ricardo Lara	UD	10	8 Jun 2019	The Star, Gold Coast, Queensland, Australia	Won vacant IBF International lightweight title
10	Win	10–0	(Philippines) Glenn Enterina	TKO	6 (10)	16 Mar 2019	Southport Sharks AFL Club, Gold Coast, Queensland, Australia	Won vacant IBF Youth lightweight title
9	Win	9–0	(Australia) Gaige Ireland	TKO	4 (10), 2:36	8 Dec 2018	Southport Sharks AFL Club, Gold Coast, Queensland, Australia	Won Australian lightweight title
8	Win	8–0	(Australia) Mark Ramirez	TKO	7 (8), 2:26	13 Oct 2018	Brisbane Convention & Exhibition Centre, Brisbane, Queensland, Australia	Won vacant Queensland State lightweight title
7	Win	7–0	(Australia) Victor Odindo	KO	8 (8), 1:39	7 Jul 2018	Mansfield Tavern, Brisbane, Queensland, Australia	
6	Win	6–0	(New Zealand) Jeffrey Kelly	TKO	3 (6), 2:23	19 May 2018	Southport Sharks AFL Club, Gold Coast, Queensland, Australia	
5	Win	5–0	(Thailand) Wanchaloem Chanajan	UD	5	17 Mar 2018	Mansfield Tavern, Brisbane, Queensland, Australia	
4	Win	4–0	(Australia) Matt McTavish	KO	1 (5), 1:49	2 Dec 2017	Mansfield Tavern, Brisbane, Queensland, Australia	
3	Win	3–0	(Australia) Kurt Finlayson	TKO	4 (6), 2:31	15 Oct 2017	Hamilton Hotel, Brisbane, Queensland, Australia	
2	Win	2–0	(Australia) Salvatore Signorino	UD	4	9 Sep 2017	Mansfield Tavern, Brisbane, Queensland, Australia	
1	Win	1–0	(Australia) Sam Williams	TKO	4 (5), 1:03	24 Jun 2017	Eatons Hill Hotel, Eatons Hill, Queensland, Australia	
