= Amari Jones =

American professional boxer (born 2002)

Personal information
- Nickname: The Reaper
- Born: Amari Da'shaun Walter Jones; April 26, 2002 (age 24) Oakland, California, U.S.
- Height: 6 ft 0 in (183 cm)
- Weight: Middleweight

Boxing career
- Reach: 74 in (188 cm)
- Stance: Orthodox

Boxing record
- Total fights: 18
- Wins: 18
- Win by KO: 16

Amari Jones (born April 26, 2002) is an American professional boxer. He competes in the middleweight division.

== Professional career ==
After turning professional in 2021 under the promotional company of three-weight world champion Devin Haney, Jones signed with Oscar De La Hoya led Golden Boy Promotions in June 2025. He won his first 15 fights, before defeating Luis Arias at T-Mobile Arena in Paradise, Nevada, on February 21, 2026, when his opponent retired at the end of the fourth round.

In his next fight, Jones knocked out former world champion Vincenzo Gualtieri in the third round at SAP Center in San Jose, California, on May 22, 2026. He followed this up by knocking out DeAundre Pettus in the eighth round at Fantasy Springs Resort Casino in Indio, California, on November 20, 2026.

== Professional boxing record ==
18 fights	18 wins	0 losses
By knockout	16	0
By decision	2	0

No.	Result	Record	Opponent	Type	Round, time	Date	Location	Notes
18	Win	18–0	DeAundre Pettus	KO	8 (12), 1:08	Nov 20, 2026	Fantasy Springs Resort Casino, Indio, California, U.S.	
17	Win	17–0	Vincenzo Gualtieri	KO	3 (12), 2:29	May 22, 2026	SAP Center, San Jose, California, U.S.	
16	Win	16–0	Luis Arias	RTD	4 (10), 3:00	Feb 21, 2026	T-Mobile Arena, Paradise, Nevada, U.S.	
15	Win	15–0	Shady Gamhour	KO	3 (10), 2:54	Nov 8, 2025	Dickies Arena, Fort Worth, Texas, U.S.	
14	Win	14–0	Kyle Lomotey	UD	8	May 10, 2025	Centre de Conférence de Sipopo, Malabo, Equatorial Guinea	
13	Win	13–0	Daniel Echeverria	KO	3 (8), 1:39	Aug 31, 2024	Marriott on Broadway, Oakland, California, U.S.	
12	Win	12–0	Armel Mbumba	TKO	6 (8), 0:39	Apr 20, 2024	Barclays Center, New York City, New York, U.S.	
11	Win	11–0	Quilisto Madera	KO	5 (8), 1:44	Dec 9, 2023	Chase Center, San Francisco, California, U.S.	
10	Win	10–0	Luis Diaz	TKO	1 (8), 1:47	Oct 7, 2023	San Luis Rio Colorado, Sonora, Mexico	
9	Win	9–0	Pachino Hill	TKO	6 (6), 1:16	May 20, 2023	MGM Grand Garden Arena, Paradise, Nevada, U.S.	
8	Win	8–0	Tej Pratap Singh	UD	6	Oct 16, 2022	Rod Laver Arena, Melbourne, Australia	
7	Win	7–0	Michael Lemelle	KO	3 (4), 2:14	Aug 5, 2022	DoubleTree Hotel, Sacramento, California, U.S.	
6	Win	6–0	Ankush Hooda	TKO	2 (6), 1:53	Jun 5, 2022	Docklands Stadium, Melbourne, Australia	
5	Win	5–0	Timothy Lee	TKO	6 (6), 2:40	Dec 4, 2021	MGM Grand Garden Arena, Paradise, Nevada, U.S.	
4	Win	4–0	Donnis Reed	KO	2 (4), 0:23	Oct 8, 2021	DoubleTree Hotel, Sacramento, California, U.S.	
3	Win	3–0	Michael Blocker	KO	1 (4), 2:02	Aug 14, 2021	Cosmopolitan Lounge, Decatur, Georgia, U.S.	
2	Win	2–0	Jonathan Ryan Burrs	TKO	1 (4), 2:56	May 29, 2021	Michelob Ultra Arena, Paradise, Nevada, U.S.	
1	Win	1–0	Alberto Delgado	KO	1 (4), 1:16	Apr 3, 2021	Buckhead Fight Club, Atlanta, Georgia, U.S.	
