= Moussa Gholam =

Moroccan boxer (born 1995)

Personal information
- Nickname: King Khalifa
- Nationality: Spanish
- Born: 10 June 1995 (age 31) Larache, Morocco
- Height: 5 ft 10 in (178 cm)
- Weight: Super-featherweight

Boxing career

Boxing record
- Total fights: 23
- Wins: 22
- Win by KO: 13
- Losses: 1

Moussa Gholam (born 10 June 1995) is a Spanish professional boxer who has held the WBO Inter-Continental super featherweight title since 2019.

== Early life ==
Gholam was born on 10 June 1995 in Larache, Morocco, where he grew up with his grandmother. He moved to Barcelona at the age of seven to join his parents, who had been living and working in Ceuta before that. Growing up in a tough neighborhood where he suffered from bullying, he began boxing to learn how to defend himself. He has been with Gallego Prada club since he started when he was eleven years old.

== Professional career ==
Gholam made his professional debut on 1 April 2016, defeating Reynaldo Maravillas via unanimous decision (UD) at the Pabellón de la Vall d'Hebron in Barcelona. After a 10–0 start, he picked up the vacant WBC Youth Silver super featherweight title on 2 February 2019 by beating Romanian prospect Alex Rat (8–3–2, 3 KO), who did not answer the bell for the sixth round. Less than ten months later, on 30 November, he faced Thai veteran Chonlatarn Piriyapinyo (61–5, 41 KO) for the vacant WBO Inter-Continental super featherweight title, stopping him by technical knockout (TKO) in the tenth round of their 10-round bout for his second title belt. This entered him into the top 15 of the WBO rankings, placing him at #12. He was named the best foreign boxer in Spain of 2019 by Espabox.com after winning all five of his fights and two titles. He was scheduled to face Venezuelan rival Otto Gámez in March 2020, but the event was cancelled due to the COVID-19 pandemic.

== Professional boxing record ==
21 fights	20 wins	1 loss
By knockout	12	0
By decision	8	1

No.	Result	Record	Opponent	Type	Round, time	Date	Location	Notes
21	Win	20–1	(Mexico) Abraham Montoya	UD	10	4 Mar 2023	Palau Olímpic Vall d'Hebrón, Barcelona, Spain	
20	Loss	19–1	(Russia) Elnur Samedov	SD	10	11 Dec 2022	DIVS, Yekaterinburg, Russia	
19	Win	19–0	(Mexico) Tomás Rojas	TKO	5 (10)	27 Feb 2022	Cotxeres de Sants, Barcelona, Spain	
18	Win	18–0	(Colombia) Victor Julio	KO	5 (8)	14 Nov 2021	Sala Razzmatazz, Barcelona, Spain	
17	Win	17–0	(Argentina) Mauro Alex Hasan Perouene	TKO	8 (8), 2:55	11 Sep 2021	Pabellón de la Vall d'Hebron, Barcelona, Spain	
16	Win	16–0	(Georgia (country)) Nukri Gamgebell	KO	1 (6), 0:19	26 Jun 2021	Pabellón Municipal, Badia del Valles, Spain	
15	Win	15–0	(Thailand) Chonlatarn Piriyapinyo	TKO	10 (10), 2:59	30 Nov 2019	Pabellón de la Vall d'Hebron, Barcelona, Spain	Won vacant WBO Inter-Continental super featherweight title
14	Win	14–0	(Mexico) Sergio Puente	UD	8	14 Sep 2019	Pabellón Municipal, San Clemente de Llobregat, Spain	
13	Win	13–0	(Mexico) Arturo López	RTD	3 (6), 3:00	7 Jun 2019	Palacio de los Deportes, Oviedo, Spain	
12	Win	12–0	(Spain) Brandon Oertel	TKO	3 (8), 2:07	30 Mar 2019	Bilbao Arena, Bilbao, Spain	
11	Win	11–0	(Romania) Alex Rat	RTD	5 (10), 3:00	2 Feb 2019	Palau Olímpic Vall d'Hebrón, Barcelona, Spain	Won vacant WBC Youth Silver super featherweight title
10	Win	10–0	(Nicaragua) Sergio González	UD	6	29 Sep 2018	Pabellón Municipal, Sant Climent de Llobregat, Spain	
9	Win	9–0	(Spain) Iago Barros	KO	3 (6), 3:00	11 May 2018	Centre Civic Casinet d'Hostafrancs, Barcelona, Spain	
8	Win	8–0	(Spain) Ruben García	KO	1 (6), 1:00	14 Apr 2018	Complex Esportiu Marina Besós, Sant Adrià de Besòs, Spain	
7	Win	7–0	(Senegal) Ibrahima Sarr	PTS	6	11 Nov 2017	Bilbao Arena, Bilbao, Spain	
6	Win	6–0	(Spain) Ricardo Fernández	UD	6	10 Jun 2017	Palau Olímpic Vall d'Hebrón, Barcelona, Spain	
5	Win	5–0	(Nicaragua) Elvis Guillen	PTS	4	24 Feb 2017	Polideportivo Municipal Sagnier, El Prat de Llobregat, Spain	
4	Win	4–0	(Nicaragua) José Aguilar	PTS	4	2 Oct 2016	Pabellón del Bon Pastor, Barcelona, Spain	
3	Win	3–0	(Romania) Stefan Nicolae	KO	3 (4), 2:58	18 Jun 2016	Palau Olímpic Vall d'Hebrón, Barcelona, Spain	
2	Win	2–0	(Romania) Daniel Enache	KO	1 (4), 0:45	27 May 2016	Casal Cultural i Recreatiu, Castellbisbal, Spain	
1	Win	1–0	(Mexico) Reynaldo Maravillas	UD	4	1 Apr 2016	Pabellón de la Vall d'Hebron, Barcelona, Spain	

== Personal life ==
Although he has lived in Spain continuously since he was a kid, he has not been able to become a Spanish citizen.

Growing up playing football in the streets of Barcelona, Gholam is naturally a fan of FC Barcelona and he has cited Ronaldinho as his favorite footballer. Apart from boxing he also works as an ambulance driver.
