= Luís Arias (boxer) =

American boxer (born 1990)

Personal information
- Nickname: Cuba
- Nationality: American
- Born: June 12, 1990 (age 36) Milwaukee, Wisconsin, U.S.
- Height: 5 ft 11 in (180 cm)
- Weight: Middleweight; Super middleweight

Boxing career
- Stance: Orthodox

Boxing record
- Total fights: 31
- Wins: 22
- Win by KO: 11
- Losses: 7
- Draws: 1
- No contests: 1
Medal record
Men's Boxing
Representing United States
AIBA Youth World Boxing Championships
Bronze medal – third place	2008 Guadalajara	Middleweight

Luís Arias (born June 12, 1990) is an American professional boxer.

== Amateur career ==
Arias was born in Milwaukee to a Nicaraguan mother and a Cuban father. He took up boxing at 8, at the United Community Center under Israel "Shorty" Acosta. He was the 2008 and 2010 U.S. national champion at middleweight. He's also won a gold medal at the National PAL Champion, an AIBA Youth World Championships bronze medal, and a silver medal at the National Golden Gloves. Arias finished his amateur career with an impressive record of 140–25.

== Professional career ==
Arias is a promotional free agent, working most recently with Mayweather Promotions. Arias made his debut in November 2012, beating Josh Thorpe via unanimous decision in a four-round bout. In August 2016, Arias defeated Darryl Cunninham for the USBA middleweight title. Arias fought Arif Magomedov on the undercard of Ward-Kovalev II. Arias dropped Magomedov with a right hand in round 5. Magomedov got up, but after Arias landed another big shot, the referee stopped the contest to give Arias a TKO victory.

In 2017, Arias fought Daniel Jacobs on November 11 at the Nassau Coliseum. The fight served as one of the final main event boxing matches on HBO. Jacobs defeated Arias by unanimous decision. Per Nielsen Media Research, Jacobs-Arias was among the top 20 most watched premium cable fights in 2017. After the Jacobs fight, Arias and Roc Nation amicably parted ways. In 2018, Arias squared off against two-time world title challenger Gabriel Rosado live on DAZN and the two battled to a split draw.

After suffering a points loss to Luke Keeler in Belfast in 2019, Arias rebounded to secure his first win in almost 4 years, when he beat Jarrett Hurd by split decision on June 6, 2021, in Miami on the undercard of Floyd Mayweather Jr. vs. Logan Paul.

== Professional boxing record ==
31 fights	22 wins	7 losses
By knockout	11	2
By decision	10	5
By disqualification	1	0
Draws	1	
No contests	1	

No.	Result	Record	Opponent	Type	Round, time	Date	Location	Notes
31	Loss	22–7–1 (1)	Amari Jones	RTD	4 (10), 3:00	Feb 21, 2026	T-Mobile Arena, Paradise, Nevada, U.S.	
30	Loss	22–6–1 (1)	Lazaro Francisco Lorenzana	UD	10	Nov 29, 2025	Pechanga Resort & Casino, Temecula, California, U.S.	
29	Loss	22–5–1 (1)	Eric Priest	UD	10	May 30, 2025	Virgin Hotels Las Vegas, Paradise, Nevada, U.S.	
28	Win	22–4–1 (1)	Shiva Thakran	RTD	3 (8), 3:00	Mar 7, 2025	Quake Arena, Hyderabad, India	
27	Win	21–4–1 (1)	Francisco Rios Amenzquita	TKO	4 (8), 2:42	Aug 24, 2024	Mexico City Arena, Mexico City, Mexico	
26	Loss	20–4–1 (1)	Erickson Lubin	KO	5 (10), 2:11	Jun 24, 2023	Minneapolis Armory, Minneapolis, Minnesota, U.S.	
25	Win	20–3–1 (1)	Jimmy Williams	UD	10	May 28, 2022	Barclays Center, New York City, New York, U.S.	
24	Loss	19–3–1 (1)	Vaughn Alexander	SD	10	Dec 5, 2021	Staples Center, Los Angeles, California, U.S.	
23	Win	19–2–1 (1)	Jarrett Hurd	SD	10	Jun 6, 2021	Hard Rock Stadium, Miami Gardens, Florida, U.S.	
22	Loss	18–2–1 (1)	Luke Keeler	PTS	10	Aug 3, 2019	Falls Park, Belfast, Northern Ireland	
21	Draw	18–1–1 (1)	Gabriel Rosado	SD	12	Nov 17, 2018	Kansas Star Arena, Mulvane, Kansas, U.S.	For vacant WBO Latino middleweight title
20	Loss	18–1 (1)	Daniel Jacobs	UD	12	Nov 11, 2017	Nassau Coliseum, Uniondale, New York, U.S.	
19	Win	18–0 (1)	Arif Magomedov	TKO	5 (10), 1:16	Jun 17, 2017	Mandalay Bay Events Center, Paradise, Nevada, U.S.	Retained IBF-USBA middleweight title
18	Win	17–0 (1)	Scott Sigmon	UD	10	Mar 31, 2017	Carnegie of Homestead Music Hall, Munhall, Pennsylvania, U.S.	Retained IBF-USBA middleweight title
17	Win	16–0 (1)	Darryl Cunningham	TKO	4 (10), 1:41	Aug 20, 2016	Wisconsin Center, Milwaukee, Wisconsin, U.S.	Won vacant IBF-USBA middleweight title
16	Win	15–0 (1)	Jorge Silva	TKO	3 (10), 2:38	Jun 4, 2016	Wisconsin Center, Milwaukee, Wisconsin, U.S.	
15	Win	14–0 (1)	Gilberto Pereira	UD	10	Mar 4, 2016	Express Live!, Columbus, Ohio, U.S.	
14	Win	13–0 (1)	Dionisio Miranda	MD	8	Dec 5, 2015	Silver Spurs Arena, Kissimmee, Florida, U.S.	
13	Win	12–0 (1)	Yoryi Estrella	KO	1 (6), 1:53	Aug 15, 2015	Mana Studios, Miami, Florida, U.S.	
12	Win	11–0 (1)	Tony Brinson	KO	3 (6), 2:01	Jun 20, 2015	Oracle Arena, Oakland, California, U.S.	
11	Win	10–0 (1)	Zachariah Kelley	DQ	2 (6), 2:55	Mar 14, 2015	Coliseo Roger L. Mendoza, Caguas, Puerto Rico	
10	Win	9–0 (1)	Angel Martinez	UD	8	Aug 30, 2014	Pearl Theatre, Paradise, Nevada, U.S.	
9	NC	8–0 (1)	Dashon Johnson	MD	8	Feb 28, 2014	Turning Stone Resort Casino, Verona, New York, U.S.	
8	Win	8–0	Cameron Allen	KO	2 (8), 2:37	Dec 6, 2013	Little Creek Casino, Shelton, Washington, U.S.	
7	Win	7–0	James Winchester	UD	6	Sep 14, 2013	MGM Grand Garden Arena, Paradise, Nevada, U.S.	
6	Win	6–0	Latif Mundy	UD	6	Jul 19, 2013	Hard Rock Hotel & Casino, Paradise, Nevada, U.S.	
5	Win	5–0	DonYil Livingston	MD	6	May 4, 2013	MGM Grand Garden Arena, Paradise, Nevada, U.S.	
4	Win	4–0	Arsenio Terrazas	KO	1 (6), 1:55	Mar 2, 2013	Hard Rock Hotel & Casino, Paradise, Nevada, U.S.	
3	Win	3–0	Edgar Perez	TKO	1 (6), 2:23	Feb 23, 2013	Detroit Masonic Temple, Detroit, Michigan, U.S.	
2	Win	2–0	Joshua Robertson	TKO	2 (6), 2:48	Feb 2, 2013	Cosmopolitan of Las Vegas, Paradise, Nevada, U.S.	
1	Win	1–0	Josh Thorpe	UD	4	Nov 10, 2012	Staples Center, Los Angeles, California, U.S.	
