= Chonlatarn Piriyapinyo =

Thai boxer

Personal information
- Nicknames: Sai-nam morana (สายน้ำมรณะ) "Crimson Tide"
- Nationality: Thai
- Born: Suriya Tatakhun (สุริยา ตาตะคุน); January 26, 1985 (age 41) Amnat Charoen Province, Thailand
- Height: 167 cm (5 ft 6 in)
- Weight: featherweight

Boxing career
- Stance: orthodox

Boxing record
- Total fights: 69
- Wins: 61
- Win by KO: 41
- Losses: 8

Suriya Tatakhun, who boxes as Chonlatarn Piriyapinyo (nickname: klang (กลาง); born in Amnat Charoen District (presently: Amnat Charoen Province), Ubon Ratchathani Province, Thailand) is a Thai professional boxer who fights at featherweight.

Piriyapinyo is dubbed as Sai-nam morana in Thailand. The nickname denotes "Deadly Tide" or "Crimson Tide", because his name "Chonlatarn" in Thai language means "river" or "stream".

He has challenged for the world championship for three times but lost each time.

He was the WBC Asian Boxing Council featherweight champion.

== Professional career ==
Piriyapinyo turned professional in December 2003 at the Royal Square, Bangkok, Thailand. In his debut Piriyapinyo defeated Mwilambwe Banza on points over six rounds.

On November 9, 2012, he challenged WBA world featherweight champion Chris "The Dragon" John at Marina Bay Sands, Singapore, he lost a one-sided 12 round unanimous decision.

On November 22, 2014, he faced WBO world featherweight champion Vasiliy Lomachenko at the Venetian in Macao. Piriyapinyo proved to be no match for the two-time Olympic gold medalist, as he lost a one-sided 12 round unanimous decision.

On July 16, 2016, he lost to Miguel Berchelt by TKO in the round 4 for WBO interim champion title in Super featherweight weight class at Polideportivo Soraya Jimenez, Los Reyes La Paz, México, Mexico.

== Professional boxing record ==
| 69 fights | 61 wins | 8 losses |
|---|---|---|
| By knockout | 41 | 4 |
| By decision | 20 | 4 |

| No. | Result | Record | Opponent | Type | Round, time | Date | Location | Notes |
|---|---|---|---|---|---|---|---|---|
| 69 | Loss | 61–8 | Phoobadin Yoohanngoh | TKO | 8 (10) | Mar 27, 2021 | Suamlum Night Bazaar, Bangkok, Thailand | For WBA Asia super lightweight title |
| 68 | Loss | 61–7 | Salimu Jengo | KO | 7 (12) | Jan 31, 2020 | Mkwakwani Stadium, Tanga, Tanzania | For vacant UBO lightweight title |
| 67 | Loss | 61–6 | Moussa Gholam | TKO | 10 (10), 2:59 | Nov 30, 2019 | Pabellón de la Vall d'Hebron, Barcelona, Spain | For vacant WBO inter-continental super featherweight title |
| 66 | Loss | 61–5 | Apichet Petchmanee | UD | 10 | Aug 17, 2019 | Workpoint Studio, Bang Phun, Thailand | For vacant WBC Asian lightweight title |
| 65 | Loss | 61–4 | Apichet Petchmanee | UD | 8 | Jun 22, 2019 | Workpoint Studio, Bang Phun, Thailand | |
| 64 | Win | 61–3 | Khashaiar Ghassemi | UD | 6 | Dec 22, 2018 | Workpoint Studio, Bang Phun, Thailand | |
| 63 | Loss | 60–3 | Miguel Berchelt | KO | 4 (12), 2:59 | Jul 16, 2016 | Polideportivo Soraya Jimenez, Los Reyes La Paz, Mexico | For WBO interim super featherweight title |
| 62 | Win | 60–2 | Karim Migea | TKO | 3 (6) | May 13, 2016 | Western University, Wacharapol Campus, Pathum Thani, Thailand | |
| 61 | Win | 59–2 | Amos Mwamakula | UD | 6 | Apr 1, 2016 | Maha Sarakham, Thailand | |
| 60 | Win | 58–2 | Sadiki Momba | TKO | 3 (12) | Jan 15, 2016 | Chaoporsuor Foundation, Bangklae, Bangkok, Thailand | Won vacant WBO Asia Pacific super featherweight title |
| 59 | Win | 57–2 | Natthapol Kongruoyutthakarn | KO | 4 (6) | Dec 4, 2015 | Royal Square, Bangkok, Thailand | |
| 58 | Win | 56–2 | Samongkol Ekchumpol | KO | 4 (6) | Oct 2, 2015 | Central Westgate Shopping Center, Bang Yai, Thailand | |
| 57 | Win | 55–2 | Boido Simanjuntak | TKO | 6 (6) | Aug 7, 2015 | Central Stadium, Ratchaburi, Thailand | |
| 56 | Win | 54–2 | Fred Sayuni | TKO | 8 (12) | Jun 5, 2015 | Western University, Wacharapol Campus, Pathum Thani, Thailand | Retained WBO Asia Pacific featherweight title |
| 55 | Win | 53–2 | Yakobus Heluka | KO | 4 (6) | May 6, 2015 | 700 Years Anniversary Sports St., Chiang Mai, Thailand | |
| 54 | Win | 52–2 | Jason Redondo | KO | 7 (12) | Mar 6, 2015 | Wat Thatthong School, Bangkok, Thailand | Won vacant WBO Asia Pacific featherweight title |
| 53 | Loss | 51–2 | Vasiliy Lomachenko | UD | 12 | Nov 23, 2014 | Cotai Arena, Macau, SAR | For WBO featherweight title |
| 52 | Win | 51–1 | Yi Ming Wang | UD | 6 | Aug 15, 2014 | Western University Bangkok Campus, Pathum Thani, Thailand | |
| 51 | Win | 50–1 | Eddy Comaro | UD | 6 | Jun 6, 2014 | Phimai, Thailand | |
| 50 | Win | 49–1 | Noldi Manakane | KO | 6 (12) | Apr 11, 2014 | Nonthaburi Pier, Nonthaburi, Thailand | Retained WBO Asia Pacific featherweight title |
| 49 | Win | 48–1 | Harri Hutagalung | KO | 3 (6) | Feb 7, 2014 | Bangkok University, Thonburi Campus, Bangkok, Thailand | |
| 48 | Win | 47–1 | Yon Armed | TKO | 3 (12) | Oct 4, 2013 | Chira Prawat Camp, Nakhon Sawan, Thailand | Retained WBO Asia Pacific featherweight title |
| 47 | Win | 46–1 | Jovill Marayan | TKO | 6 (12), 1:41 | Jun 7, 2013 | Teerachai Muangmai Market, Nakhon Sawan, Thailand | Retained PABA featherweight title |
| 46 | Win | 45–1 | Nathan Bolcio | TKO | 5 (12), 1:16 | Mar 22, 2013 | OTOP Centre, Khueang Nai, Thailand | Won vacant PABA featherweight title |
| 45 | Win | 44–1 | Arief Blader | RTD | 4 (12), 3:00 | Feb 1, 2013 | Prankatai Pittayakhom School, Phran Kratai, Thailand | Retained WBO Asia Pacific featherweight title |
| 44 | Loss | 43–1 | Chris John | UD | 12 | Nov 9, 2012 | Marina Bay Sands Hotel, Singapore | For WBA (Super) featherweight title |
| 43 | Win | 43–0 | Richard Olisa | TKO | 6 (12) | Jun 1, 2012 | Lonkhon Villege Stadium, Sakon Nakhon, Thailand | Retained WBO Asia Pacific featherweight title |
| 42 | Win | 42–0 | Randy Megrino | TKO | 6 (12), 2:29 | Apr 25, 2012 | Bung Nam Thao, Thailand | Retained WBO Asia Pacific featherweight title |
| 41 | Win | 41–0 | Arief Blader | KO | 4 (12), 1:18 | Jan 23, 2012 | Bangkok University, Thonburi Campus, Bangkok, Thailand | Retained WBO Asia Pacific featherweight title |
| 40 | Win | 40–0 | Roel Laguna | TKO | 3 (12), 2:57 | Nov 15, 2011 | Maehongson, Thailand | Retained WBO Asia Pacific featherweight title |
| 39 | Win | 39–0 | Roel Laguna | KO | 6 (12), 0:23 | Sep 2, 2011 | Bangla Stadium, Patong, Thailand | Retained WBO Asia Pacific featherweight title |
| 38 | Win | 38–0 | Roel Laguna | KO | 10 (12), 1:52 | Jun 28, 2011 | Sarawittaya School, Bangkok, Thailand | Retained WBO Asia Pacific featherweight title |
| 37 | Win | 37–0 | Adones Aguelo | UD | 12 | Mar 4, 2011 | Laplae, Thailand | Retained WBO Asia Pacific featherweight title |
| 36 | Win | 36–0 | Masayuki Wakimoto | TKO | 5 (12), 1:21 | Dec 29, 2010 | Kaodin Temple, Doem Bang Nang Buat, Thailand | Retained WBO Asia Pacific featherweight title |
| 35 | Win | 35–0 | Sonny Gonzales | TKO | 8 (12), 2:48 | Sep 15, 2010 | Plabplanarai, Chanthaburi, Thailand | Won vacant WBO Asia Pacific featherweight title |
| 34 | Win | 34–0 | Ericson Origenes | UD | 12 | Jul 30, 2010 | Khemmarat, Thailand | Retained Asian WBC featherweight title |
| 33 | Win | 33–0 | Jun Talape | KO | 6 (12) | Jan 8, 2010 | Phu Kamyao, Thailand | Retained Asian WBC featherweight title |
| 32 | Win | 32–0 | Jun Talape | TKO | 2 (12), 1:52 | Nov 6, 2009 | Rimbung Market, Jaengwattana, Bangkok, Thailand | Retained Asian WBC featherweight title |
| 31 | Win | 31–0 | Edgar Gabejan | RTD | 7 (12), 3:00 | Sep 4, 2009 | Chawang, Thailand | Retained Asian WBC featherweight title |
| 30 | Win | 30–0 | Jonel Alibio | KO | 11 (12), 2:34 | Jun 5, 2009 | Ground stadium of Sawangdaendin, Sakon Nakhon, Thailand | Retained Asian WBC featherweight title |
| 29 | Win | 29–0 | Jack Asis | TKO | 7 (12), 2:45 | Apr 3, 2009 | Samut Sakhon, Thailand | Retained Asian WBC featherweight title |
| 28 | Win | 28–0 | Jaime Barcelona | UD | 12 | Jan 2, 2009 | Rimbung Market, Jaengwattana, Bangkok, Thailand | Retained Asian WBC featherweight title |
| 27 | Win | 27–0 | Joan de Guia | TKO | 3 (6) | Sep 12, 2008 | The Office of Pak Hai District, Ayutthaya, Thailand | |
| 26 | Win | 26–0 | Magbau Pathy | UD | 6 | Jul 8, 2008 | Omnoi Stadium, Samut Sakhon, Thailand | |
| 25 | Win | 25–0 | Jaime Barcelona | UD | 12 | May 22, 2008 | Kochasith, Nong Khae, Thailand | Retained Asian WBC featherweight title |
| 24 | Win | 24–0 | Elpher Paganpan | KO | 3 (8), 1:45 | Mar 17, 2008 | Lat Bua Luang School, Lat Bua Luang, Thailand | |
| 23 | Win | 23–0 | Amor Tino | KO | 5 (12), 2:55 | Feb 20, 2008 | Ban Kwao, Chaiyaphum, Thailand | Retained Asian WBC featherweight title |
| 22 | Win | 22–0 | Judefiel Aclo | UD | 8 | Oct 23, 2007 | Wat Takien, Bang Pahan, Thailand | |
| 21 | Win | 21–0 | Vinvin Rufino | TKO | 5 (12), 1:31 | Aug 31, 2007 | The Office of Pak Hai District, Ayutthaya, Thailand | Retained Asian WBC featherweight title |
| 20 | Win | 20–0 | Damrong Kongsuk | TKO | 7 (12), 0:41 | Jun 15, 2007 | Roi-Et, Thailand | Retained Asian WBC featherweight title |
| 19 | Win | 19–0 | Jack Asis | UD | 12 | Apr 13, 2007 | Wat Klang, Pathum Thani, Thailand | Retained Asian WBC featherweight title |
| 18 | Win | 18–0 | Adrianus Kaauni | KO | 3 (8) | Jan 26, 2007 | Samut Sakhon, Thailand | |
| 17 | Win | 17–0 | Vinvin Rufino | TKO | 7 (12), 2:24 | Dec 5, 2006 | Royal Square, Bangkok, Thailand | Retained Asian WBC featherweight title |
| 16 | Win | 16–0 | Nakhon Pathom | UD | 12 | Sep 25, 2006 | Siam Nakhon Pathom, Thailand | Retained Asian WBC featherweight title |
| 15 | Win | 15–0 | Jaime Barcelona | UD | 12 | May 19, 2006 | Siam Shanghai Shopping Mall, Nonthaburi, Thailand | Retained Asian WBC featherweight title |
| 14 | Win | 14–0 | Rodney Jun Alba | TKO | 3 (12), 0:41 | Mar 24, 2006 | Si Sa Ket, Thailand | Retained Asian WBC featherweight title |
| 13 | Win | 13–0 | Muhammad Ilham | KO | 3 (12) | Feb 23, 2006 | Amnart Charoen, Thailand | Retained Asian WBC featherweight title |
| 12 | Win | 12–0 | Jeffrey Onate | UD | 12 | Dec 5, 2005 | Royal Square, Bangkok, Thailand | Retained Asian WBC featherweight title |
| 11 | Win | 11–0 | NOT LISTED | UD | 12 | Oct 20, 2005 | Bangbuathong, Thailand | Retained Asian WBC featherweight title |
| 10 | Win | 10–0 | Julius Tarona | UD | 12 | Jun 17, 2005 | Wat Chonglom, Tachalorm, Samut Sakhon, Thailand | Retained Asian WBC featherweight title |
| 9 | Win | 9–0 | Samson Elnino | KO | 3 (12), 0:55 | Apr 28, 2005 | Taladthai Market, Pathum Thani, Thailand | Retained Asian WBC featherweight title |
| 8 | Win | 8–0 | Jun Paderna | UD | 12 | Mar 4, 2005 | Taladthai Market, Pathum Thani, Thailand | Retained Asian WBC featherweight title |
| 7 | Win | 7–0 | Nathan Barcelona | TKO | 5 (12), 2:27 | Dec 24, 2004 | Maepranom Food Industry, Nakhon Pathom, Thailand | Retained Asian WBC featherweight title |
| 6 | Win | 6–0 | Joen Honno | TKO | 12 (12), 1:02 | Oct 15, 2004 | The Mall Shopping Center Taphra, Bangkok, Thailand | Retained Asian WBC featherweight title |
| 5 | Win | 5–0 | Rolando Gerongco | UD | 12 | Jul 9, 2004 | Sadao, Thailand | Won vacant Asian WBC featherweight title |
| 4 | Win | 4–0 | Mark Sales | TKO | 3 (6) | Jun 4, 2004 | Lang Suan, Thailand | |
| 3 | Win | 3–0 | F. Ronald | TKO | 3 (6) | Apr 8, 2004 | Rajadamnern Stadium, Bangkok, Thailand | |
| 2 | Win | 2–0 | Banza Mwilambwe | PTS | 6 | Jan 16, 2004 | The Mall Shopping Center Bangkapi, Bangkok, Thailand | |
| 1 | Win | 1–0 | Banza Mwilambwe | PTS | 6 | Dec 5, 2003 | Royal Square, Bangkok, Thailand | |
