= Lukáš Děkýš =

Czech boxer (born 1996)

Personal information
- Nickname: The Czech Nightmare
- Born: Lukáš Děkýš; 16 November 1996 (age 29) Ostrava, Czech Republic
- Height: 5 ft 9 in (175 cm)
- Weight: Welterweight

Boxing career
- Reach: 71 in (180 cm)
- Stance: Orthodox

Boxing record
- Total fights: 20
- Wins: 20
- Win by KO: 7
- Losses: 0
- No contests: 0

Lukáš Děkýš (born 16 November 1996) is a Czech professional boxer.

== Professional career ==
Děkýš made his professional debut on 10 November 2018 against Petr Gina. He would win the bout via TKO in the first minute of the first round.

His first title fight would come six fights later after racking up and impressive 6–0 record. He faced off against Polish boxer Damian Kiwior for the vacant Republic of Poland super welterweight title. Děkýš would win the fight, and thus improving to 7–0 and claiming his first championship.

After eight months away from the ring, he would return to face Michał Leśniak for the vacant Republic of Poland International welterweight title. Děkýš would once again win, and thus claiming his second championship and keeping his undefeated record.

After another two fights, he would face off against Argentina's Dimas Agustin Garateguy for the vacant WBC Asian welterweight title. Děkýš would win once again via a 7th-round TKO.

His next title fight would come a year later after he fought three times in between. He faced off against Kosovo's Edmond Zefi for the vacant WBC CISBB welterweight title. Děkýš would win the fight after Zefi was disqualified twenty-two seconds into round 5 for throwing a punch while being separated by the referee. This would improve Děkýš's record to a staggering 15–0.

His next fight would come five months later where he took on Przemysław Runowski for the vacant WBC Baltic and Republic of Poland international welterweight titles. Děkýš would win via a knockout in the ninth round.

== Professional boxing record ==
20 fights	20 wins	0 losses
By knockout	7	0
By decision	13	0

No.	Result	Record	Opponent	Type	Round, time	Date	Location	Notes
20	Win	20–0	Oliver Chudzik	UD	10	12 Sep 2026	Hala BOSiR, Bieruń, Poland	Won inaugural Polish Diaspora welterweight title
19	Win	19–0	Kristian Daniel	TKO	3 (8), 2:50	9 May 2026	Ondrej Nepela Arena, Bratislava, Slovakia	Won vacant WBA Baltic and Pro OG welterweight titles
18	Win	18–0	Jorge Moya	RTD	1 (8), 3:00	28 Mar 2026	Hala Atol, ul. Kochanowskiego 2, Oleśnica, Poland	
17	Win	17–0	Dominik Prchal	UD	10	30 Dec 2025	Lucerna Hall, Prague, Czech Republic	
16	Win	16–0	Przemysław Runowski	KO	9 (10), 2:06	24 May 2025	Hala ZSP nr 1, ul. Kossaka 1A, Opoczno, Poland	Won vacant WBC Baltic and Republic of Poland International welterweight titles.
15	Win	15–0	Edmond Zefi	DQ	5 (10), 0:22	30 Dec 2024	Lucerna Hall, Prague, Czech Republic	Won vacant WBC CISBB welterweight title.
14	Win	14–0	Hamo Aperjan	PTS	6	23 Aug 2024	Polygon Libros, Ostrava, Czech Republic	
13	Win	13–0	Kamil Młodziński	UD	8	22 Mar 2024	Hala Widowiskowo-Sportowa, ul. Lotnicza 52, Legnica, Poland	
12	Win	12–0	Alfred Kqira	UD	8	26 Dec 2023	Kursaal, Bern, Switzerland	
11	Win	11–0	Dimas Agustin Garateguy	TKO	7 (10), 2:59	5 Oct 2023	MOSiR Hall, Lublin, Poland	Won vacant WBC Asian welterweight title.
10	Win	10–0	Volodymyr Hordiienko	UD	10	27 May 2023	Unyp Arena, Prague, Czech Republic	
9	Win	9–0	Anatoli Hunanyan	UD	10	28 Jan 2023	Sportovní hala, Kladno, Czech Republic	
8	Win	8–0	Michał Leśniak	UD	10	18 Nov 2022	Grupa Azoty Arena, Puławy, Poland	Won vacant Republic of Poland International welterweight title.
7	Win	7–0	Damian Kiwior	UD	10	25 Mar 2022	Mazurkas Conference Center, Ożarów Mazowiecki, Poland	Won vacant Republic of Poland super welterweight title
6	Win	6–0	Michał Syrowatka	KO	3 (6), 0:49	17 Dec 2021	Hala MOSiR, Radom, Poland	
5	Win	5–0	Piotr Bis	UD	6	29 Oct 2021	Hala MCKiS, Jaworzno, Poland	
4	Win	4–0	Aleksander Jasiewicz	UD	4	13 Mar 2021	Hala Osrodka Sportu i Rekreacji, ul. Strumykowa 1, Dzierżoniów, Poland	
3	Win	3–0	Denis Mądry	TKO	3 (6), 1:58	29 Jan 2021	Klub Explosion, Warsaw, Poland	
2	Win	2–0	Panagiotis Matsagkos	UD	6	22 Feb 2020	Safiren Konferenscenter, Katrineholm, Sweden	
1	Win	1–0	Petr Gina	TKO	1 (4), 1:05	10 Nov 2018	Střední škola prof. Zdeňka Matějčka, Ostrava, Czech Republic	
