= Khalil Coe =

American boxer (born 1996)

Personal information
- Nickname: Big Steppa
- Born: September 8, 1996 (age 29) Jersey City, New Jersey, United States
- Height: 5 ft 10 in (178 cm)
- Weight: Light-heavyweight

Boxing career
- Stance: Orthodox

Boxing record
- Total fights: 13
- Wins: 11
- Win by KO: 8
- Losses: 1
- Draws: 1

Khalil Coe (born September 8, 1996) is an American professional boxer. He is a two-time former WBC-USNBC light-heavyweight champion.

== Early life ==
Coe has revealed that he learned to fight at a very young age due to the rough area he grew up. His mother put him in boxing because he kept getting into street fights.

== Amateur career ==
The highlight of Coe's amateur career was winning the Chemistry Cup in Germany, during which he became the first man to stop two-time gold medalist Julio Cesar La Cruz. Coe was also a part of the United States national team but was unable to qualify for the Olympics due to his criminal record.

== Professional career ==
Coe signed a promotional contract with Eddie Hearn led Matchroom Boxing immediately after turning professional in April 2021. He made his pro-debut against Nathaniel Tadd on the undercard of Devin Haney vs Jorge Linares at Michelob Ultra Arena in Las Vegas on May 29, 2021, stopping his opponent in the second round after dropping him with a body shot.

After six wins and a draw in his next seven fights, Coe took on unbeaten Juan Gerardo Osuna on the undercard of Conor Benn vs Peter Dobson at the Chelsea Ballroom in Las Vegas on February 3, 2024. He sent Osuna to the canvas three times, stopping him in the second round.

Coe won the vacant WBC-USNBC light-heavyweight title by stopping Kwame Ritter in the second round at the Wells Fargo Center in Philadelphia on July 13, 2024.

At the same venue on November 9, 2024, he lost the title, and his unbeaten professional record, in his first defense against Manuel Gallegos, going down to a ninth round technical knockout defeat having been floored four times during the bout.

A rematch was held at Domo Alcalde in Guadalajara, Mexico, on May 30, 2025, and Coe regained the title when Gallegos' corner retired him before the start of the sixth round.

He was scheduled to defend the title against Jesse Hart at Fontainebleau in Las Vegas on January 24, 2026, but missed the required weight by more than seven pounds and was therefore stripped of the championship. The fight went ahead and Coe claimed a majority decision win in a contest where both boxers were deducted a point for rule infringements. Two of the ringside judges scored the bout 96–92 and 95–93 respectively for Coe, while the third had it a 94–94 draw.

== Professional boxing record ==
13 fights	11 wins	1 loss
By knockout	8	1
By decision	3	0
Draws	1	

No.	Result	Record	Opponent	Type	Round, time	Date	Location	Notes
13	Win	11–1–1	Jesse Hart	MD	10	Jan 24, 2026	Fontainebleau, Las Vegas, Nevada, U.S	Coe missed weight so WBC-USNBC light-heavyweight title only on the line for Hart
12	Win	10–1–1	Manuel Gallegos	TKO	6 (10), 0:00	May 30, 2025	Domo Alcalde, Guadalajara, Mexico	Won WBC-USNBC light-heavyweight title
11	Loss	9–1–1	Manuel Gallegos	TKO	9 (10), 0:07	Nov 9, 2024	Wells Fargo Center, Philadelphia, Pennsylvania, U.S.	Lost WBC-USNBC light6heavyweight title
10	Win	9–0–1	Kwame Ritter	TKO	2 (10), 1:59	Jul 13, 2024	Wells Fargo Center, Philadelphia, Pennsylvania, U.S.	Won vacant WBC-USNBC light-heavyweight title
9	Win	8–0–1	Juan Gerardo Osuna	TKO	2 (8), 1:14	Feb 3, 2024	Chelsea Ballroom, Las Vegas, Nevada, U.S.	
8	Win	7–0–1	Kenmon Evans	TKO	2 (8), 1:21	Sep 23, 2023	Caribe Royale Orlando, Orlando, Florida, U.S.	
7	Win	6–0–1	Buneet Bisla	TKO	7 (8), 2:02	Jun 24, 2023	Madison Square Garden Theater, New York City, New York, U.S.	
6	Win	5–0–1	James Quiter	KO	3 (6), 1:51	Apr 8, 2023	Boeing Center at Tech Port, San Antonio, Texas, U.S.	
5	Win	4–0–1	Bradley Olmeda	UD	6	Nov 12, 2022	Rocket Mortgage FieldHouse, Cleveland, Ohio, U.S.	
4	Win	3–0–1	William Langston	UD	6	Apr 30, 2022	Madison Square Garden, New York City, New York, U.S.	
3	Win	2–0–1	Dylan O' Sullivan	TKO	2 (4), 2:16	Feb 5, 2023	Footprint Center, Phoenix, Arizona, U.S.	
2	Draw	1–0–1	Aaron Casper	MD	4	Nov 19, 2021	SNHU Arena, Manchester, New Hampshire, U.S.	
1	Win	1–0	Nathaniel Tadd	PTS	4	May 29, 2021	Michelob Ultra Arena, Las Vegas, Nevada, U.S.	
