= Dmytro Mytrofanov =

Ukrainian boxer (born 1989)

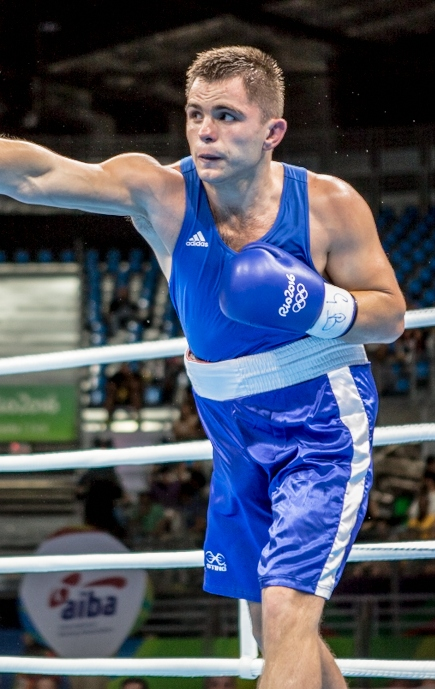
- Mytrofanov at the 2016 Olympics

Personal information
- Born: 8 November 1989 (age 36) Chernihiv, Ukrainian SSR, Soviet Union
- Education: Chernihiv National Pedagogical University
- Height: 173 cm (5 ft 8 in)

Sport
- Sport: Amateur boxing
- Club: Nadezhda Sports Club; Kolos
- Coached by: Ruslan Said; Vadym Kazanin; Andriy Korets
Medal record
Men's amateur boxing
Representing Ukraine
European Amateur Championships
| Bronze medal – third place | 2011 Ankara | Middleweight (−75 kg) |
Summer Universiade
| Gold medal – first place | 2013 Kazan | Middleweight (−75 kg) |

Dmytro Yuriyovych Mytrofanov (Ukrainian: Дмитро Юрійович Митрофанов, born 8 November 1989) is a Ukrainian middleweight professional boxer. He won the national title in 2008 and 2012 and a bronze medal at the 2011 European Championships. He competed at the 2016 Olympics, but was eliminated in the first bout.

== Career ==
Mytrofanov was raised as an orphan – his mother died two months after his birth. His father soon remarried and left Dmytro with his grandparents, who both died by the time he entered a boarding school. Mytrofanov took up boxing in 2001, and in 2008 won his first national championship (It was held after the 2008 Olympics and was not an Olympic selection). His professional debut was made on 27 October 2017 with fight against an American boxer Brandon Maddox.

== Professional boxing record ==
| 15 fights | 13 wins | 1 loss |
|---|---|---|
| By knockout | 6 | 1 |
| By decision | 7 | 0 |
| Draws | 1 | |

| No. | Result | Record | Opponent | Type | Round, time | Date | Location | Notes |
|---|---|---|---|---|---|---|---|---|
| 4 | Win | 3–0–1 | (Georgia (country)) Beka Murjikneli | TKO | 2 (6), 2:26 | 22 Dec 2018 | Terminal, Brovary, Ukraine | |
| 3 | Draw | 2–0–1 | (Netherlands) Gino Kanters | PTS | 4 | 10 Nov 2018 | (United Kingdom) Manchester Arena, Manchester, England | |
| 2 | Win | 2–0 | (United States) Marcus Willis | UD | 8 | 13 Jan 2018 | (United States) Midwest Event Center, Northlake, Illinois, US | |
| 1 | Win | 1–0 | (United States) Brandon Maddox | TKO | 4 (6), 1:50 | 27 Oct 2017 | (United States) The Belvedere, Elk Grove Village, Illinois, US | Professional debut |

== Political stance on Donald Trump ==
Since 2020, he has been a member of the Chernihiv City Council representing the "Ridnyi Dim" party. In 2025, he voted to rename the "Kazka" Park in Chernihiv's Sherstianka district to "Trump Park". However, the notable feature of this decision is that under Ukrainian law, it is prohibited to name toponyms after living persons
