= Janibek Alimkhanuly =

Kazakhstani boxer (born 1993)

Personal information
- Other names: Zhanibek Alimkhanuly
- Born: 1 April 1993 (age 33) Almaty, Kazakhstan
- Height: 182 cm (6 ft 0 in)
- Weight: 75 kg (165 lb)

Boxing career
- Weight class: Middleweight
- Reach: 71 1/2 in (182 cm)
- Stance: Southpaw

Boxing record
- Total fights: 17
- Wins: 17
- Win by KO: 12
Medal record
Men's amateur boxing
Representing Kazakhstan
World Championships
Gold medal – first place	2013 Almaty	Middleweight
Asian Championships
Gold medal – first place	2013 Amman	Middleweight
Asian Games
Gold medal – first place	2014 Incheon	Middleweight

Jänıbek Älımhanūly (also spelled as Zhanibek Alimkhanuly; Kazakh: Жәнібек Әлімханұлы; born 1 April 1993) is a Kazakh professional boxer. He held the World Boxing Organisation (WBO) middleweight title from 2022 to 2026 and the International Boxing Federation (IBF) middleweight title from 2023 to 2026. As an amateur, he won gold medals at the 2013 World Championships, 2013 Asian Championships, and 2014 Asian Games. He also represented Kazakhstan at the 2016 Summer Olympics, losing in the quarter-finals.

== Early life and amateur career ==
Alimkhanuly began boxing at the age of six because of his father and grandfather's love of the sport. His first amateur bout was at the same age, a match that he lost.

Alimkhanuly was a highly decorated amateur. In 2013, he won a gold medal at the Asian Amateur Boxing Championships; later that year, he competed in the AIBA World Boxing Championships, defeating Jason Quigley of Ireland to win gold. The following year, he won a gold medal at the 2014 Asian Games after he defeated Odai Al-Hindawi of Jordan. At the 2015 World Series of Boxing, he competed as part of the Kazakhstani Astana Arlans, defeating Argentina's Cristian Rodrigo Zarate en route to his team's victory.

At the 2016 Olympics in Rio, Alimkhanuly lost in the quarter-finals to Kamran Shakhsuvarly of Azerbaijan by split decision. Shortly after this, Alimkhanuly turned professional at the age of 23, though he would briefly return to the amateurs to compete at the 2017 Kazakh National Championships, losing in the quarter-finals to Mikhail Kokhanchik.

His final record as an amateur has been reported as 300–8.

== Professional career ==
=== Early career ===
Alimkhanuly made his professional debut on 29 October 2016 against Milton Núñez, a former opponent of Alimkhanuly's fellow countryman Gennady Golovkin, on 29 October 2016 in his home city of Almaty, Kazakhstan. He won the bout via first-round technical knockout.

From 2016 to 2019, Alimkhanuly amassed a record of 8–0. Ahead of his fight with Issah Samir on 21 March 2020, the world was struck with COVID-19. Alimkhanuly's fight was canceled, but Alimkhanuly asserted that there were more pressing concerns: "We just lost the fight date, someone lost the family. It’s not easy. We will fight when everything calms down but nobody will not return them to their family. I wish all patients a quick recovery.”

In his toughest test yet, Alimkhanuly faced former WBA (Regular) champion Rob Brant as the co-featured bout to Vasiliy Lomachenko vs. Masayoshi Nakatani on 26 June 2021 in Paradise, Nevada. He knocked Brant down in the sixth round en route to an eighth-round corner retirement victory.

Alimkhanuly faced the former two-time world middleweight champion Hassan N'Dam N'Jikam on 20 November 2021, on the Terence Crawford vs. Shawn Porter undercard. He won the fight by an eight-round technical knockout. Alimkhanuly was ahead on the scorecards at the time of the stoppage (with scores of 70–62, 70–62 and 70–61) and had knocked N'Jikam down in the third round.

=== WBO middleweight champion ===
==== Alimkhanuly vs. Dignum ====
On 30 November 2021, the WBO ordered their middleweight champion Demetrius Andrade to make a mandatory title defense against Alimkhanuly. Three months later, on 21 March 2022, the sanctioning body allowed Andrade to move up in weight and face Zach Parker for the interim super middleweight title instead, while allowing him to keep the middleweight championship as well. Andrade later withdrew from the fight, as he suffered a right shoulder injury during training camp. As such, Alimkhanuly faced the undefeated Danny Dignum for the vacant WBO interim middleweight title on 21 May 2022, in the main event of an ESPN broadcast card, which took place at the Resorts World Event Center in Las Vegas, Nevada. He made quick work of his opponent, stopping Dignum with an uppercut near the end of the second round. Alimkhanuly landed 21 of 33 power punches and 34 of 94 overall, while Dignum managed to land only 6 out of 45 total punches.

On 20 July 2022, the WBO once again ordered Andrade to defend his title against Alimkhanuly, giving the pair 30 days to come to terms. Andrade officially vacated his middleweight title on 30 August, and Alimkhanuly was promoted to the WBO Champion that same day.

==== Alimkhanuly vs. Bentley ====
On 22 September 2022, it was revealed that Alimkhanuly would make a voluntary title defense against the 14th-ranked WBO middleweight contender Denzel Bentley. The title bout was booked as the headliner of an ESPN+ broadcast card, which took place at the Palms Casino Resort in Las Vegas, Nevada, on November 12, 2022. Alimkhanuly retained his title by unanimous decision, with two judges scoring the bout 116–112 in his favor, while the third judge awarded him a wider scorecard of 118–110. He outlanded Bentley 187 to 159 in total punches and 137 to 125 in power punches, landing 35% of all the strikes he threw, compared to Bentley's 25.9%.

==== Alimkhanuly vs. Butler ====
On 20 November 2022, the WBO formally ordered Alimkhanuly to make a mandatory title defense against the former junior middleweight champion Jaime Munguia. On 2 December, it was revealed that Munguia's team had declined to proceed with the mandatory title fight. On 22 February 2023, Alimkhanuly was ordered to make a mandatory title defense against the former WBO light-middleweight champion Liam Smith. As Smith was contractually obligated to face Chris Eubank Jr in an immediate rematch, Alimkhanuly instead made his second title defense against the sixth-ranked WBO middleweight contender Steven Butler on 13 May 2023. He won the fight by a second-round knockout.

=== Unified middleweight champion ===
==== Alimkhanuly vs. Gualtieri ====
Alimkhanuly faced the IBF middleweight titleholder Vincenzo Gualtieri in a championship unification bout on 14 October 2023, at the Fort Bend County Epicenter in Rosenberg, Texas. Prior to the fight, Alimkhanuly began training with Brian Viloria, having previously trained under Buddy McGirt. In the fifth round, he dazed Gualtieri with a hard left uppercut that he recovered from; after dazing Gualtieri again with a left uppercut in the sixth round, the referee stopped the fight and awarded Alimkhanuly the victory by TKO. With this victory, he became the second boxer from Kazakhstan to earn the unified middleweight championship.

==== Alimkhanuly vs. Mikhailovich ====
Alimkhanuly was scheduled to face Andrei Mikhailovich on 13 July 2024, in Las Vegas, but the bout fell off after he withdrew due to weight cutting issue. On 18 September 2024, it was announced that the fight was rescheduled for 4 October 2024 in Sydney, Australia with the IBF middleweight title on the line. Alimkhanuly won the fight by TKO in the ninth round.

==== Alimkhanuly vs. Ngamissengue ====
Alimkhanuly defended his unified IBF and WBO middleweight titles against Anauel Ngamissengue at Barys Arena in Astana, Kazakhstan on 5 April 2025. He won by stoppage in the fifth round.

==== Failed Drug Test and Cancelled Bout With Lara ====
Holding the unified IBF and WBO middleweight titles, Alimkhanuly was scheduled to face WBA middleweight champion Erislandy Lara for the unified titles, at Frost Bank Center in San Antonio, Texas, on 6 December 2025. On 2 December 2025, it was announced that Alimkhanuly failed a VADA anti-doping test, and was replaced by Johan Gonzalez. On 10 March 2026, Alimkhanuly was stripped of his IBF middleweight title.

== Personal life ==
Alimkhanuly is an avid reader. He enjoys books on nutrition and pottery. He is learning the English language and enjoys watering his plants on weekends.

== Professional boxing record ==
17 fights	17 wins	0 losses
By knockout	12	0
By decision	5	0

No.	Result	Record	Opponent	Type	Round, time	Date	Location	Notes
17	Win	17–0	Anauel Ngamissengue	TKO	5 (12) 2:59	5 Apr 2025	Barys Arena, Astana, Kazakhstan	Retained WBO and IBF middleweight titles
16	Win	16–0	Andrei Mikhailovich	TKO	9 (12), 2:45	4 Oct 2024	The Star, Pyrmont, Australia	Retained IBF middleweight title
15	Win	15–0	Vincenzo Gualtieri	TKO	6 (12), 1:25	14 Oct 2023	Fort Bend Community Center, Rosenberg, Texas, US	Retained WBO middleweight title; Won IBF middleweight title
14	Win	14–0	Steven Butler	KO	2 (12), 2:35	13 May 2023	Stockton Arena, Stockton, California, US	Retained WBO middleweight title
13	Win	13–0	Denzel Bentley	UD	12	12 Nov 2022	Palms Casino Resort, Las Vegas, Nevada, US	Retained WBO middleweight title
12	Win	12–0	Danny Dignum	KO	2 (12), 2:49	21 May 2022	Resorts World Event Center, Las Vegas, Nevada, US	Won vacant WBO interim middleweight title
11	Win	11–0	Hassan N'Dam N'Jikam	TKO	8 (10), 2:40	20 Nov 2021	Michelob Ultra Arena, Paradise, Nevada, US	Retained WBC Continental Americas and WBO Global middleweight titles
10	Win	10–0	Rob Brant	RTD	8 (10), 3:00	26 Jun 2021	Virgin Hotels Las Vegas, Paradise, Nevada, US	Retained WBC Continental Americas middleweight title
9	Win	9–0	Gonzalo Coria	KO	2 (10), 2:59	9 Oct 2020	MGM Grand Conference Center, Paradise, Nevada, US	Retained WBO Global middleweight title
8	Win	8–0	Albert Onolunose	KO	6 (10), 2:31	9 Nov 2019	Chukchansi Park, Fresno, California, US	Retained WBC Continental Americas middleweight title
7	Win	7–0	Stuart McLellan	KO	5 (10), 2:51	17 Aug 2019	Banc of California Stadium, Los Angeles, California, US	Retained WBC Continental Americas and WBO Global middleweight titles
6	Win	6–0	Cristian Olivas	UD	10	12 Apr 2019	Staples Center, Los Angeles, California, US	Won vacant WBC Continental Americas and WBO Global middleweight titles
5	Win	5–0	Steven Martinez	TKO	5 (8), 0:21	2 Feb 2019	The Ford Center at The Star, Frisco, Texas, US	
4	Win	4–0	Vaughn Alexander	SD	8	3 Nov 2018	Don Haskins Center, El Paso, Texas, US	
3	Win	3–0	Carlos Galvan	UD	6	28 Sep 2018	Oracle Arena, Oakland, California, US	
2	Win	2–0	Gilberto dos Santos	UD	6	9 Sep 2017	Saryarka Velodrome, Nur-Sultan, Kazakhstan	
1	Win	1–0	Milton Núñez	TKO	1 (6), 2:25	29 Oct 2016	Almaty Arena, Almaty, Kazakhstan	

== See also ==
- List of world middleweight boxing champions

Sporting positions
World boxing titles
Vacant Title last held by Avtandil Khurtsidze	WBO middleweight champion Interim title May 21 – August 26, 2022; Promoted	Vacant Title next held by Denzel Bentley
Vacant Title last held by Demetrius Andrade	WBO middleweight champion August 26, 2022 – July 20, 2026; Vacated	Succeeded by Denzel Bentley; Interim champion promoted
Preceded by Vincenzo Gualtieri	IBF middleweight champion October 14, 2023 – March 10, 2026; Stripped	Vacant Title next held by Aaron McKenna
