= Asian Boxing Council =

Professional boxing organization

- Abbreviation: ABCO
- Formation: 1985
- Type: Federation of national professional boxing commissions
- Headquarters: Thailand
- Location: Bangkok, Thailand
- Region served: Asia
- Members: 20 national members
- Official language: English
- President: Pol.Gen.Kovid Bhakdibhumi
- Affiliations: World Boxing Council
- Website: http://www.asianboxingcouncil.com/

The Asian Boxing Council (ABCO) is a professional boxing organization that sanctions title fights in the Greater Asian region.

== History ==
At the 1985 World Boxing Council (WBC) annual convention in Bangkok, Thailand, the late Sahasombhop Srisomvongse and representatives from Sri Lanka, Nepal, Pakistan, India, Qatar, Bangladesh, Bhutan, Jordan, Malaysia and Kuwait launched the Asian Boxing Council (ABCO) as a confederation affiliated with WBC.

After Sahasombhop’s death in 2000, Pol. Gen. Kovid Bhakdibhumi, became President of the WBC Asian Boxing Council.

=== Purpose ===
1. To promote the boxing activities throughout Asia.

2. To organize top rated championship

3. To supervise the safe competition in Asian region.

== Members ==
ABCO has 20 national members.

== Key Persons ==
Position:	Name:	Nationality:
Lifetime President	Pol.Gen.Kovid Bhakdibhumi	(Thailand)
President	Gen.Tanapol Bhakdibhumi	(Thailand)
Vice President	Col. Damrong Simakajornboon	(Thailand)
Secretary General	Kevin P. Noone	(Republic of Ireland)

== Current ABCO title holders ==
Weight class:	Greater Asian Champion:	Asian Continental Champion:	Silver Asian Champion:	Female Champion:
Atomweight	(for female boxing only)	(for female boxing only)	(for female boxing only)	vacant
Strawweight	(China) Yujie Zeng	vacant	vacant	vacant
Junior flyweight	vacant	(Philippines) Jerry Francisco	(China) Yin He Xu	vacant
Flyweight	(Thailand) Thananchai Charunphak	vacant	vacant	(Thailand) Sothita Sitthichai
Super flyweight	(China) Jiangtao Cao	vacant	(Bangladesh) Utshob Ahmed	(Hong Kong) Sheau Ru Yang
Bantamweight	(Thailand) Petch CP Freshmart	(Philippines) Noli James Maquilan	vacant	vacant
Super bantamweight	vacant	(Philippines) Marlon Tapales	(Malaysia) Daeloniel McDelon	(India) Urvashi Singh
Featherweight	(Thailand) Sathaporn Saart	(Singapore) Prithiv Raaj Elansharan	(Armenia) Mikael Arutyunyan	vacant
Junior lightweight	(China) Wensong Liu	(Thailand) Arnon Yupang	vacant	(Australia) Skye Falzon
Lightweight	vacant	(Singapore) Danial Abdul Jalil	(China) Hanyun Wu	vacant
Junior welterweight	vacant	(Turkey) Ege Arin Konuk	(Egypt) Khalis Nasir	vacant
Welterweight	(Czech Republic) Lukáš Děkýš	(Thailand) Chan Sala	(Indonesia) Rahul Pinem	vacant
Junior middleweight	vacant	vacant	vacant	vacant
Middleweight	vacant	(Australia) Victor Nagbe	vacant	vacant
Super middleweight	(Turkey) Serhat Guler	vacant	(Singapore) Davis Anderson	vacant
Light heavyweight	vacant	(Malaysia) Adli Hafidz	(China) Shuxin Gao	vacant
Cruiserweight	vacant	(Germany) Yusuf Sultanoglu	(Russia) Artur Ter-Israelyan	vacant
Bridgerweight	vacant	(Italy) Alessio Bisutti	vacant	vacant
Heavyweight	vacant	vacant	vacant	vacant

== ABCO Awards ==
Year:	Boxer of the year:	Promoter of the year:
2005	(Thailand) Saenghiran Lookbanyai	(Thailand) Virat Vachararattanawongsi
2006	(Thailand) David Nakornluang	(Thailand) Pariyakorn Ratanasuban
2007	(Thailand) Chonlatarn Piriyapinyo	(Kazakhstan) Yerik Jailauov
2008	(Kazakhstan) Beibut Shumenov	(Russia) German Titov
2009	(Thailand) Chonlatarn Piriyapinyo	(Thailand) Surachart Pisitwutthinan
2010	(Thailand) Terdsak Kokietgym	(Thailand) Surachart Pisitwutthinan
2011	(Thailand) Kompayak Porpramook	(Thailand) Surachart Pisitwutthinan
2012	(China) Xiong Zhao Zhong	(Thailand) Kokiet Panichyarom
2013	(Thailand) Srisaket Sor Rungvisai	(Thailand) Surachart Pisitwutthinan
2014	(Thailand) Suriyan Sor Rungvisai	(Thailand) Surachart Pisitwutthinan
2015	(Thailand) Nawaphon Por Chokchai	(Thailand) Kokiet Panichyarom

== See also ==
- List of boxing organisations
- North American Boxing Federation
- Oriental and Pacific Boxing Federation
- European Boxing Union
