= Artem Chebotarev =

Russian boxer

Medal record

Representing Russia

Men's Amateur boxing

World Championships
Bronze medal – third place	2013 Almaty	−75 kg

European Championships
Gold medal – first place	2010 Moscow	−75 kg

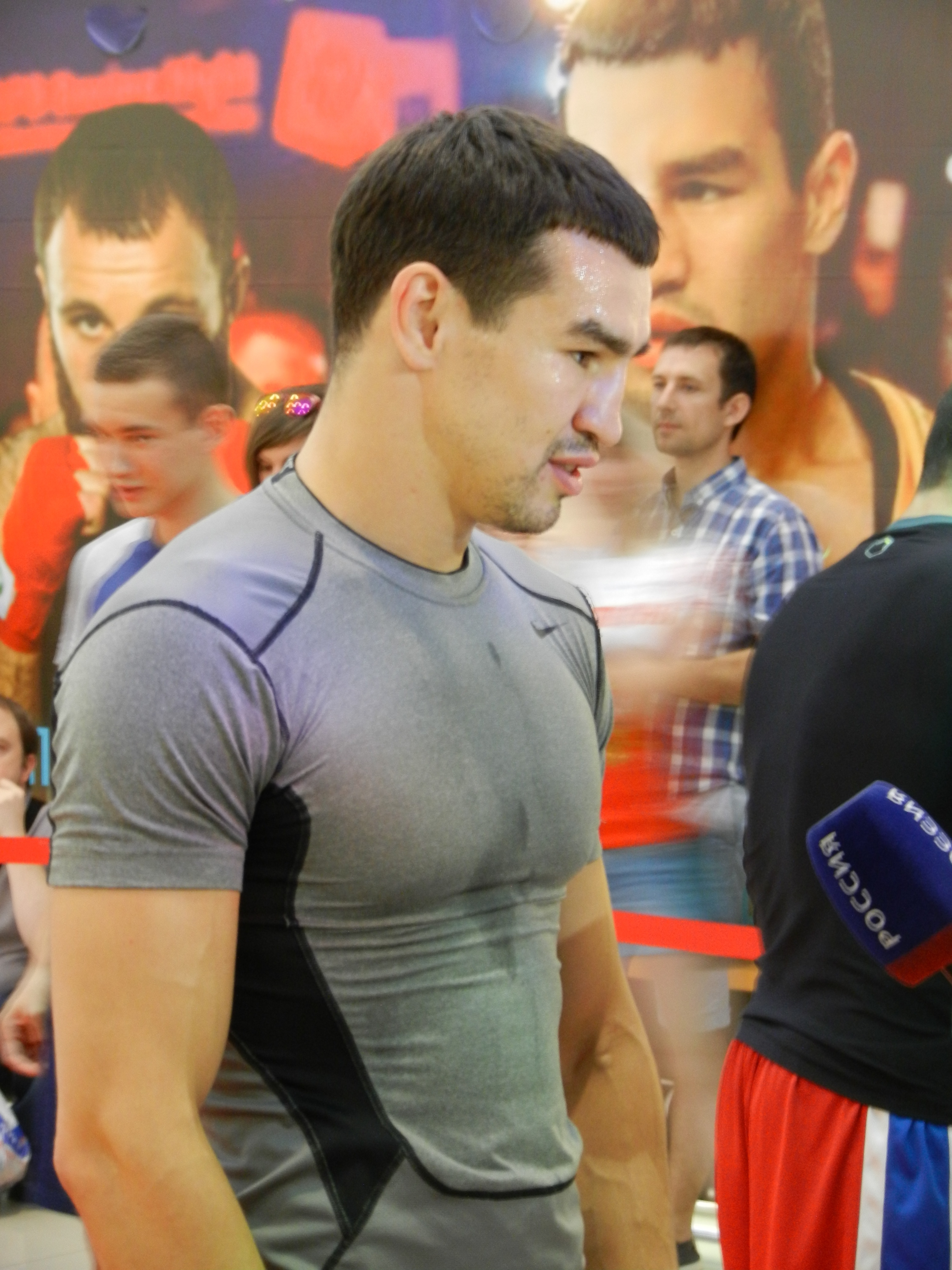

Artem Nikolayevich Chebotarev (Russian: Артём Николаевич Чеботарёв; born 26 October 1988 in Stepnoye, Saratov Oblast, Russian SFSR) is a Russian amateur boxer who competes in the -75 kg weight division. He won a bronze medal at the 2013 AIBA World Boxing Championships.

== Biography ==
Artem Chebotarev was born in the village of Stepnoye, Saratov Oblast. He started boxing at the age of 11 with coach Yedilbai Kaziev.

== Sport career ==
In 2016 he was the captain of the Olympic boxing team in Rio de Janeiro.

== Political career ==
In 2016 he began his political career, he became a deputy of the Saratov City Duma.

In 2020 he became the leader of the regional branch of the new party For Truth.

In 2021 he was elected chairman of the regional branch of the united party A Just Russia – For Truth in the Saratov Oblast.

== Professional boxing record ==
6 fights	6 wins	0 losses
By knockout	4	0
By decision	2	0

No.	Result	Record	Opponent	Type	Round, Time	Date	Location	Notes
6	Win	6-0	(Argentina) Javier Francisco Maciel	UD		2018-11-10	(Russia) Ekaterinburg	vacant World Boxing Organisation Inter-Continental Middleweight Title
5	Win	5-0	(Brazil) Carmelito De Jesus	KO		2018-09-07	(Russia) Chelyabinsk	
4	Win	4-0	(Germany) Nuhu Lawal	UD		2017-09-07	(Russia) Saratov	vacant International Boxing Organization International Middleweight Title
3	Win	3-0	(Kenya) Daniel Wanyonyi	KO		2017-05-25	(Latvia) Riga	
2	Win	2-0	(Hungary) Krisztian Santa	KO		2017-03-10	(Spain) Benidorm	
1	Win	1-0	(Hungary) Norbert Szekeres	KO		2017-01-08	(Latvia) Riga	
