= Boxing at the 2008 Summer Olympics – Middleweight =

Boxing competitions

Men's middleweight boxing at the Games of the XXIX Olympiad
- Venue: Workers Indoor Arena, Beijing
- Date: 9-24 August 2008
- Competitors: 28 from 28 nations

Medalists
1st place, gold medalist(s)		James Degale	Great Britain
2nd place, silver medalist(s)		Emilio Correa Jr.	Cuba
3rd place, bronze medalist(s)		Vijender Singh	India
3rd place, bronze medalist(s)		Darren Sutherland	Ireland

The middleweight competition was the fourth-highest weight class featured in amateur boxing at the 2008 Summer Olympics, and was held at the Workers Indoor Arena, Beijing China. Middleweights were limited to a maximum of 75 kilograms in body mass.

Like all Olympic boxing events, the competition was a straight single-elimination tournament. Both semifinal losers are awarded bronze medals, so no boxers compete again after their first loss. Bouts consist of four rounds of two minutes each, with one-minute breaks between rounds. Punches are scored only if the white area on the front of the glove makes full contact with the front of the head or torso of the opponent. Five judges score each bout; three of the judges have to signal a scoring punch within one second for the punch to score. The winner of the bout is the boxer who scores the most valid punches by the end of the bout.

== Draw ==
All times are China Standard Time (UTC+8)

Round of 32; Saturday, August 9, 2008; 13:30-15:00 & 19:00-20:30
Naim Terbunja (SWE)	6
Matvey Korobov (RUS)	18
Said Rachidi (MAR)	2
Bakhtiyar Artayev (KAZ)	8
James DeGale (GBR)	13
Mohamed Hikal (EGY)	4
Shawn Estrada (USA)	10
Ezequiel Maderna (ARG)	2
Andranik Hakobyan (ARM)	14
Ahmed Saraku (GHA)	8
Jean-Mickaël Raymond (FRA)	2
Elshod Rasulov (UZB)	8
Emilio Correa Jr. (CUB)	17
Jarrod Fletcher (AUS)	4
Wang Jianzheng (CHN)	6
Sergiy Derevyanchenko (UKR)	15
Konstantin Buga (GER)	7
Carlos Góngora (ECU)	14
Herry Saliku Biembe (COD)	2
Georgios Gazis (GRE)	7
Cho Deok-Jin (KOR)	3
Angkhan Chomphuphuang (THA)	9
Badou Jack (GAM)	2
Vijender Singh (IND)	13

Round of 16; Saturday, August 16, 2008; 15:30-16:30 & 21:00-22:00
Alfonso Blanco (VEN)	18
Argenis Casimiro Núñez (DOM)	7
Darren Sutherland (IRL)	RSC
Nabil Kassel (ALG)
Matvey Korobov (RUS)	7
Bakhtiyar Artayev (KAZ)	10
James DeGale (GBR)	11
Shawn Estrada (USA)	5
Andranik Hakobyan (ARM)
Elshod Rasulov (UZB)	RSCI
Emilio Correa Jr. (CUB)	18
Sergiy Derevyanchenko (UKR)	4
Carlos Góngora (ECU)	12
Georgios Gazis (GRE)	1
Angkhan Chomphuphuang (THA)	3
Vijender Singh (IND)	13

Quarterfinals; Wednesday, August 20, 2008; 20:01-21:00
Alfonso Blanco (VEN)	1
Darren Sutherland (IRL)	11
Bakhtiyar Artayev (KAZ)	3
James DeGale (GBR)	8
Elshod Rasulov (UZB)	7
Emilio Correa Jr. (CUB)	9
Carlos Góngora (ECU)	4
Vijender Singh (IND)	9

Semifinals; Friday, August 22, 2008; 15:01-15:30
Darren Sutherland (IRL)	3
James DeGale (GBR)	10
Emilio Correa Jr. (CUB)	8
Vijender Singh (IND)	5

Final; Saturday, August 23, 2008; 20:46-21:00
James DeGale (GBR)	16
Emilio Correa Jr. (CUB)	14

== See also ==
- 2009 World Amateur Boxing Championships – Middleweight
