= 2009 World Amateur Boxing Championships – Middleweight =

Boxing competitions

The Middleweight competition was the fourth-highest weight class featured at the 2009 World Amateur Boxing Championships, and was held at the Mediolanum Forum. Middleweights allowed in the competition were limited to a maximum of 75 kilograms in body mass.

== Medalists ==
Gold	Abbos Atoev; Uzbekistan
Silver	Andranik Hakobyan; Armenia
Bronze	Vijender Singh; India
Bronze	Alfonso Blanco; Venezuela

== Seeds ==
1. (India) Vijender Singh (semifinals)
2. (Venezuela) Alfonso Blanco (semifinals)
3. (Moldova) Victor Cotiujanschii (quarterfinals)
4. (Uzbekistan) Abbos Atoev (champion)
5. (Cuba) Rey Recio (third round)
6. (China) Zhang Jianting (quarterfinals)
7. (Ukraine) Sergiy Derevyanchenko (quarterfinals)
8. (Armenia) Andranik Hakobyan (final)

== Draw ==
=== Finals ===
Quarterfinals
Vijender Singh (IND)	12
Sergiy Derevyanchenko (UKR)	4
Konstantin Buga (GER)	3
Abbos Atoev (UZB)	4
Victor Cotiujanschii (MDA)	1
Andranik Hakobyan (ARM)	8
Zhang Jianting (CHN)	8
Alfonso Blanco (VEN)	11

Semifinals
Vijender Singh (IND)	3
Abbos Atoev (UZB)	7
Andranik Hakobyan (ARM)	4
Alfonso Blanco (VEN)	3

Final
Abbos Atoev (UZB)	9
Andranik Hakobyan (ARM)	0

=== Top half ===
==== Section 1 ====
Round 1
Steve Rolls (CAN)	10
Levan Guledan (GEO)	3
Mariano Hilario (ESP)
Luca Podda (ITA)	RSC
Daniel Shisia (KEN)	0
Adem Kılıççı (TUR)	27
Tijan Kebbeh (GAM)	1
Tibor Varga (SVK)	7
Alex Theran (COL)	12
Terrell Gausha (USA)	6
Danijel Topalovic (BIH)
Sergiy Derevyanchenko (UKR)	RSC

Round 2
Vijender Singh (IND)	14
Azamat Belgibayev (KAZ)	8
Steve Rolls (CAN)	7
Luca Podda (ITA)	6
Adem Kılıççı (TUR)	16
Tibor Varga (SVK)	2
Alex Theran (COL)	8
Sergiy Derevyanchenko (UKR)	13

Round 3
Vijender Singh (IND)	4
Steve Rolls (CAN)	2
Adem Kılıççı (TUR)	6
Sergiy Derevyanchenko (UKR)	13

Quarterfinals
Vijender Singh (IND)	12
Sergiy Derevyanchenko (UKR)	4

==== Section 2 ====
Round 1
Rey Recio (CUB)	15
Norbert Harcsa (HUN)	5
Oliver Obradovic (AUT)	1
Artem Chebotarev (RUS)	17
Konstantin Buga (GER)	20
Jacinto Do Rosario (CPV)	3
Mladen Manev (BUL)	18
Fatlum Zhuta (MKD)	4
Manqoosh Nasimi (AFG)
Ronald Gavril (ROU)	KO
Israel Duffus (PAN)	2
Yamaguchi Florentino (BRA)	18
Alema Vaele (ASA)	7
Kentaro Hayashi (JPN)	11
Ahmed Saraku (GHA)	4
Abbos Atoev (UZB)	16

Round 2
Rey Recio (CUB)	26
Artem Chebotarev (RUS)	6
Konstantin Buga (GER)	12
Mladen Manev (BUL)	1
Ronald Gavril (ROU)	10
Yamaguchi Florentino (BRA)	18
Kentaro Hayashi (JPN)
Abbos Atoev (UZB)	RET

Round 3
Rey Recio (CUB)	9
Konstantin Buga (GER)	10
Yamaguchi Florentino (BRA)	3
Abbos Atoev (UZB)	8

Quarterfinals
Konstantin Buga (GER)	3
Abbos Atoev (UZB)	4

=== Bottom half ===
==== Section 3 ====
Round 1
Victor Cotiujanschii (MDA)	16
Cho Deok-Jin (KOR)	6
Chuluuntumur Tumurkhuyag (MGL)	RSC
Albert Blaize (DMA)
Vardan Beseljan (CZE)
Damian Hooper (AUS)	RSCI
Mathieu Bauderlique (FRA)	16
Ruslan Karipov (KGZ)	8
Stipica Brekalo (CRO)	11
Farid Aghayev (AZE)	8
Darren O'Neill (IRL)	RSC
Rajan Shilpakar (NEP)
Rachid Hamani (ALG)	5
Naim Terbunja (SWE)	10
Abdulridha Waheed (IRQ)	6
Andranik Hakobyan (ARM)	13

Round 2
Victor Cotiujanschii (MDA)	10
Chuluuntumur Tumurkhuyag (MGL)	4
Damian Hooper (AUS)	12
Mathieu Bauderlique (FRA)	7
Stipica Brekalo (CRO)	3
Darren O'Neill (IRL)	19
Naim Terbunja (SWE)	11
Andranik Hakobyan (ARM)	15

Round 3
Victor Cotiujanschii (MDA)	15
Damian Hooper (AUS)	5
Darren O'Neill (IRL)	3
Andranik Hakobyan (ARM)	7

Quarterfinals
Victor Cotiujanschii (MDA)	1
Andranik Hakobyan (ARM)	8

==== Section 4 ====
Round 1
Zhang Jianting (CHN)	11
Imrod Bartholomew (GRN)	0
Said Rachidi (MAR)
Vladimir Milevskij (LTU)	RSCI
Jaime Cortez (ECU)	RSCH
Fiacre Agnan (BEN)
Mikalai Vesialou (BLR)	27
Nathan McEwen (NZL)	1
Nikola Jovanović (SRB)	16
Josur Kurbanov (TJK)	10
Artem Masliy (ISR)	16
Ndiaye Mamadou Paya (SEN)	12
Henry Biembe (COD)	15
Nisar Khan (PAK)	13
Arnaud Sony Junior (HAI)	0
Alfonso Blanco (VEN)	23

Round 2
Zhang Jianting (CHN)	10
Vladimir Milevskij (LTU)	9
Jaime Cortez (ECU)	6
Mikalai Vesialou (BLR)	18
Nikola Jovanović (SRB)	12
Artem Masliy (ISR)	10
Henry Biembe (COD)	1
Alfonso Blanco (VEN)	10

Round 3
Zhang Jianting (CHN)	14
Mikalai Vesialou (BLR)	12
Nikola Jovanović (SRB)	1
Alfonso Blanco (VEN)	5

Quarterfinals
Zhang Jianting (CHN)	8
Alfonso Blanco (VEN)	11

== See also ==
- Boxing at the 2008 Summer Olympics – Middleweight
