= São Vicente, São Paulo =

São Vicente
- Municipality
- Municipality of São Vicente
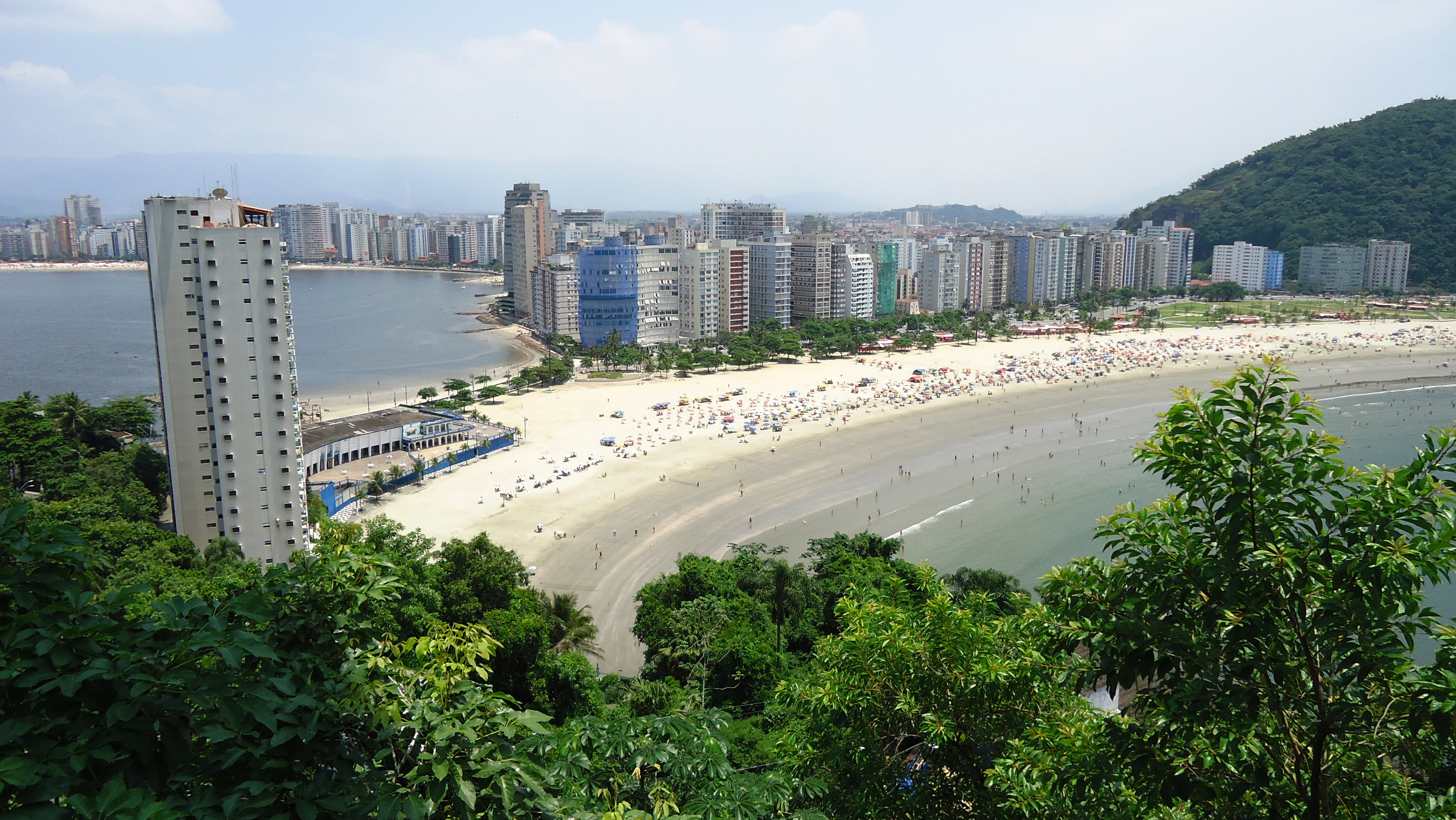
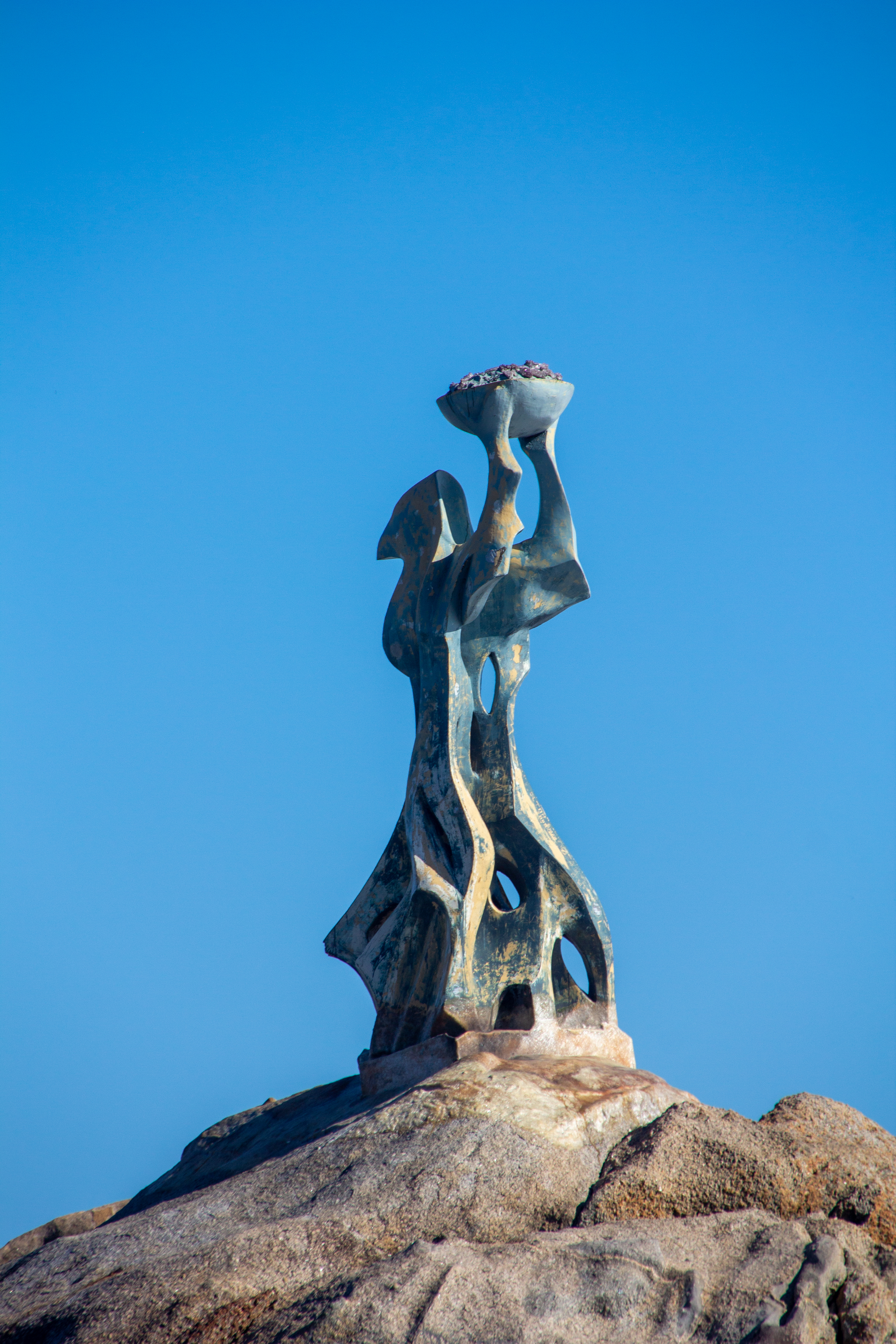
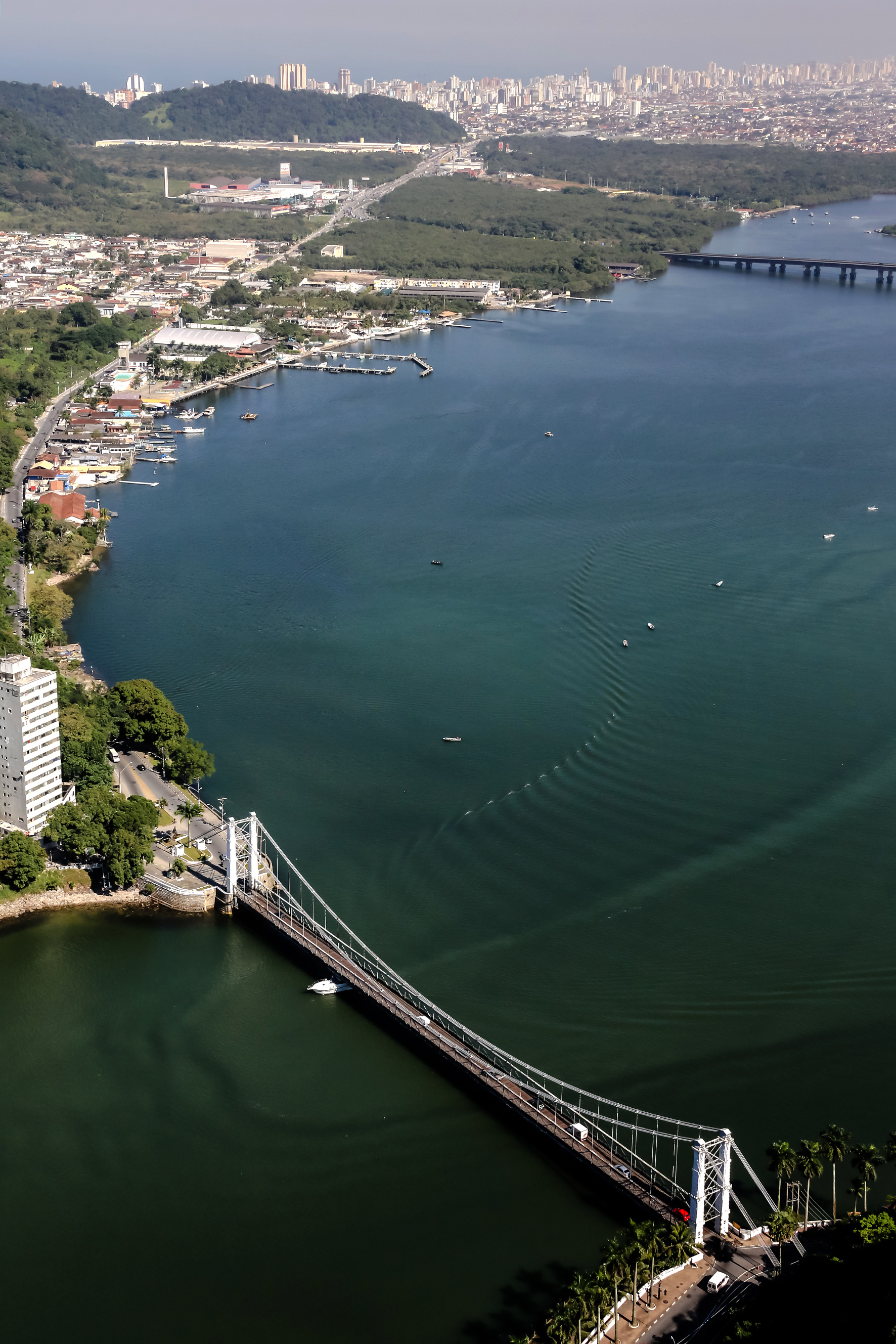
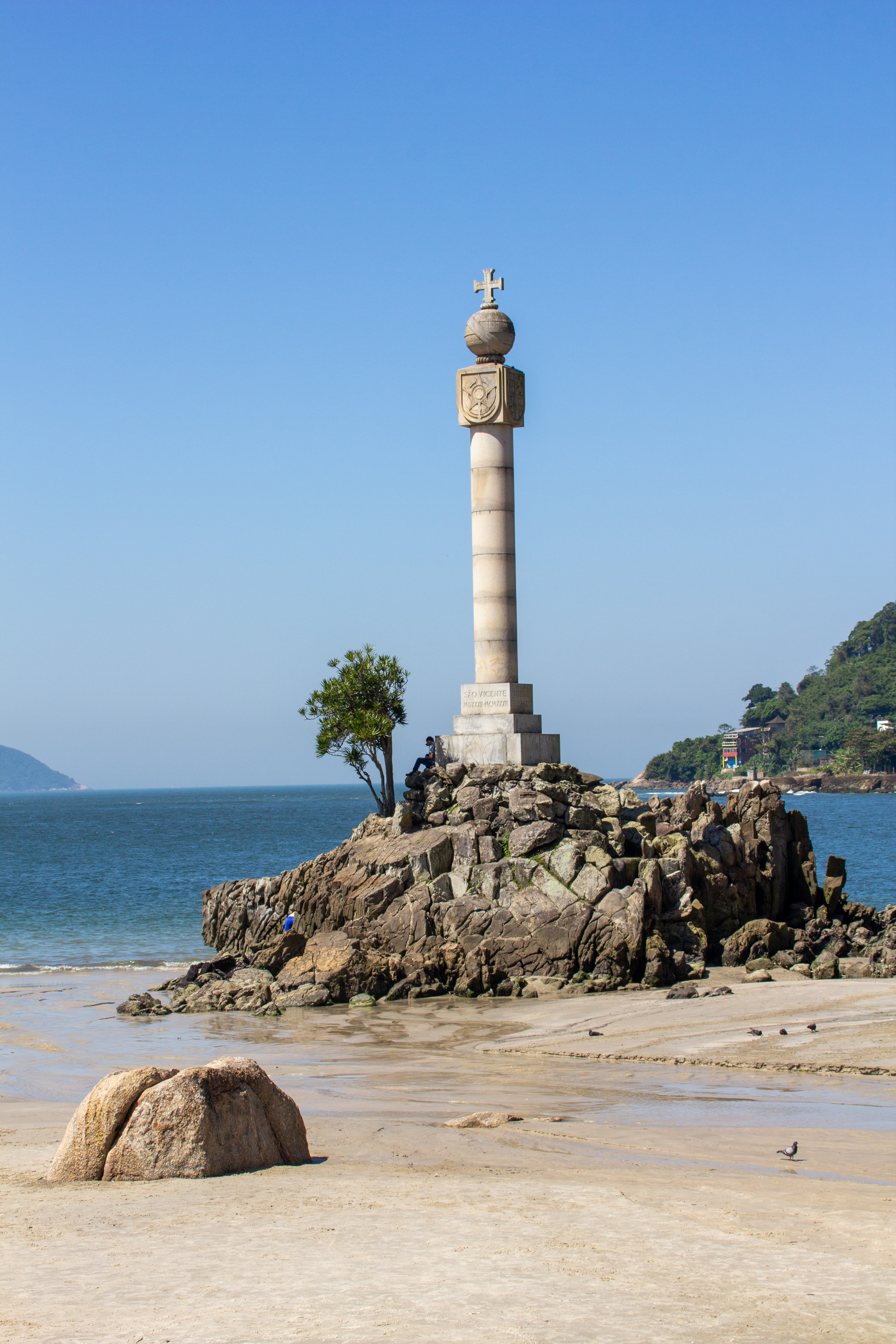
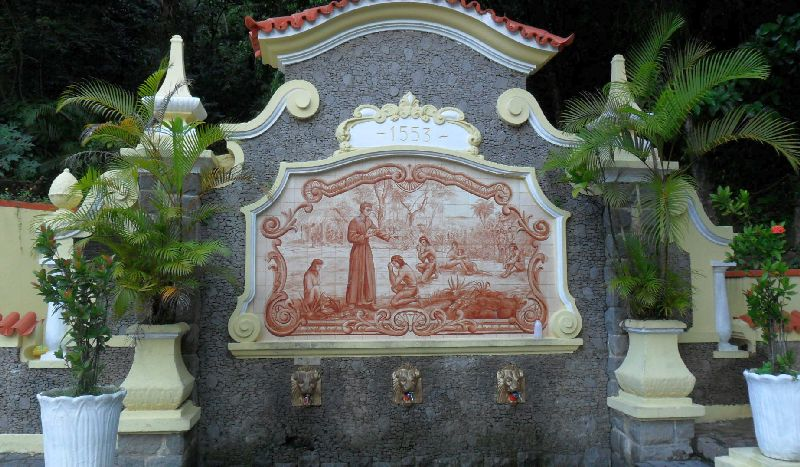
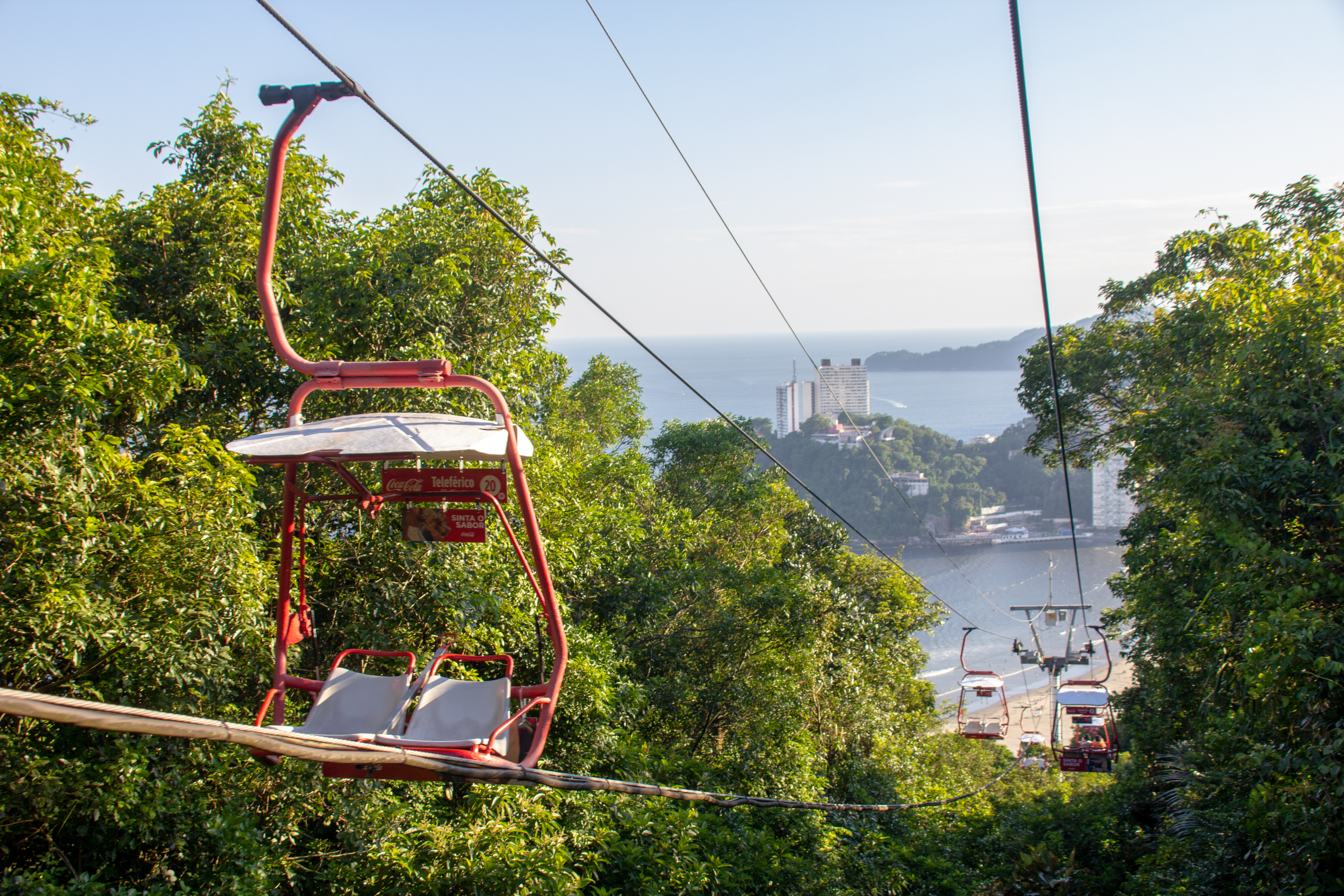
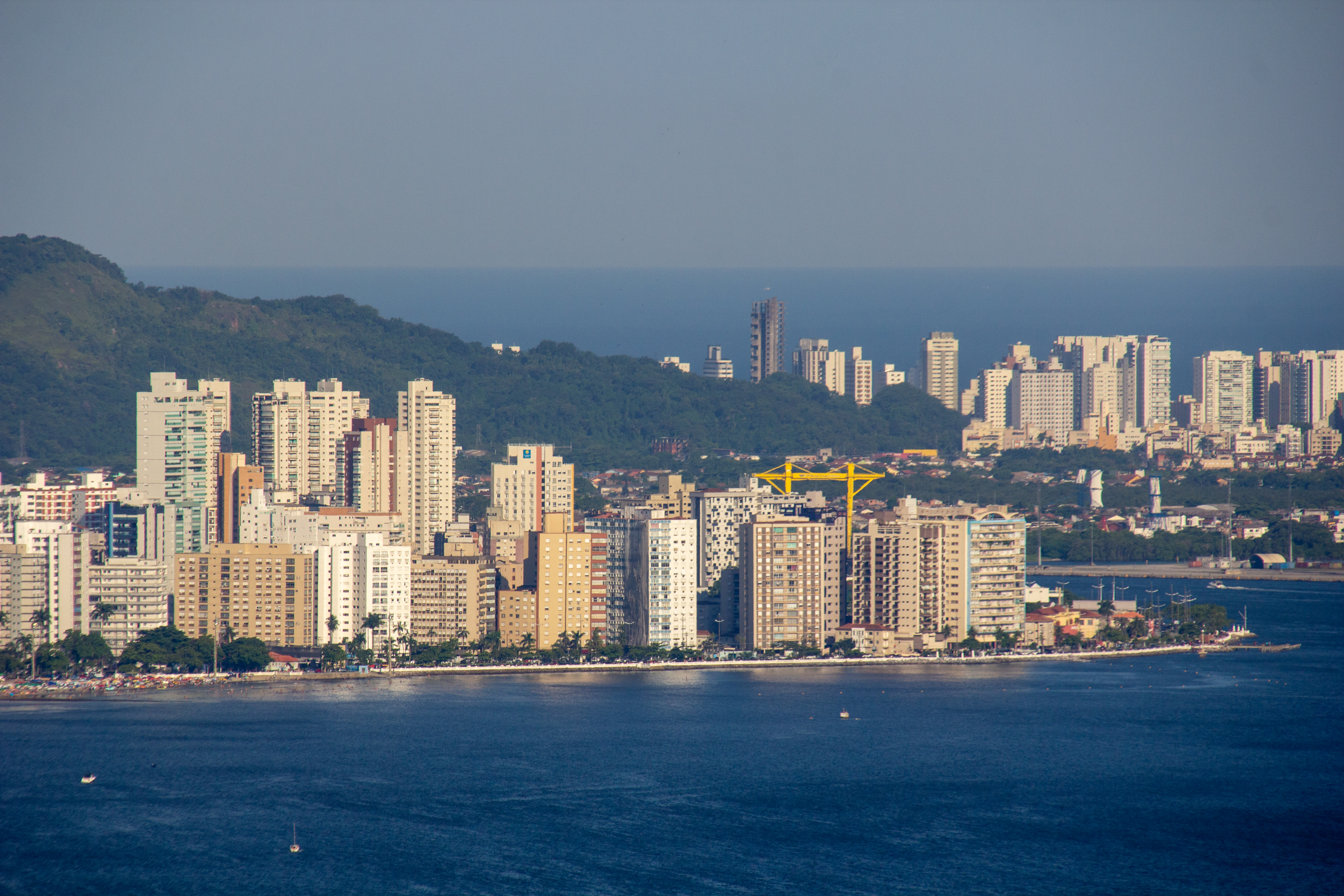
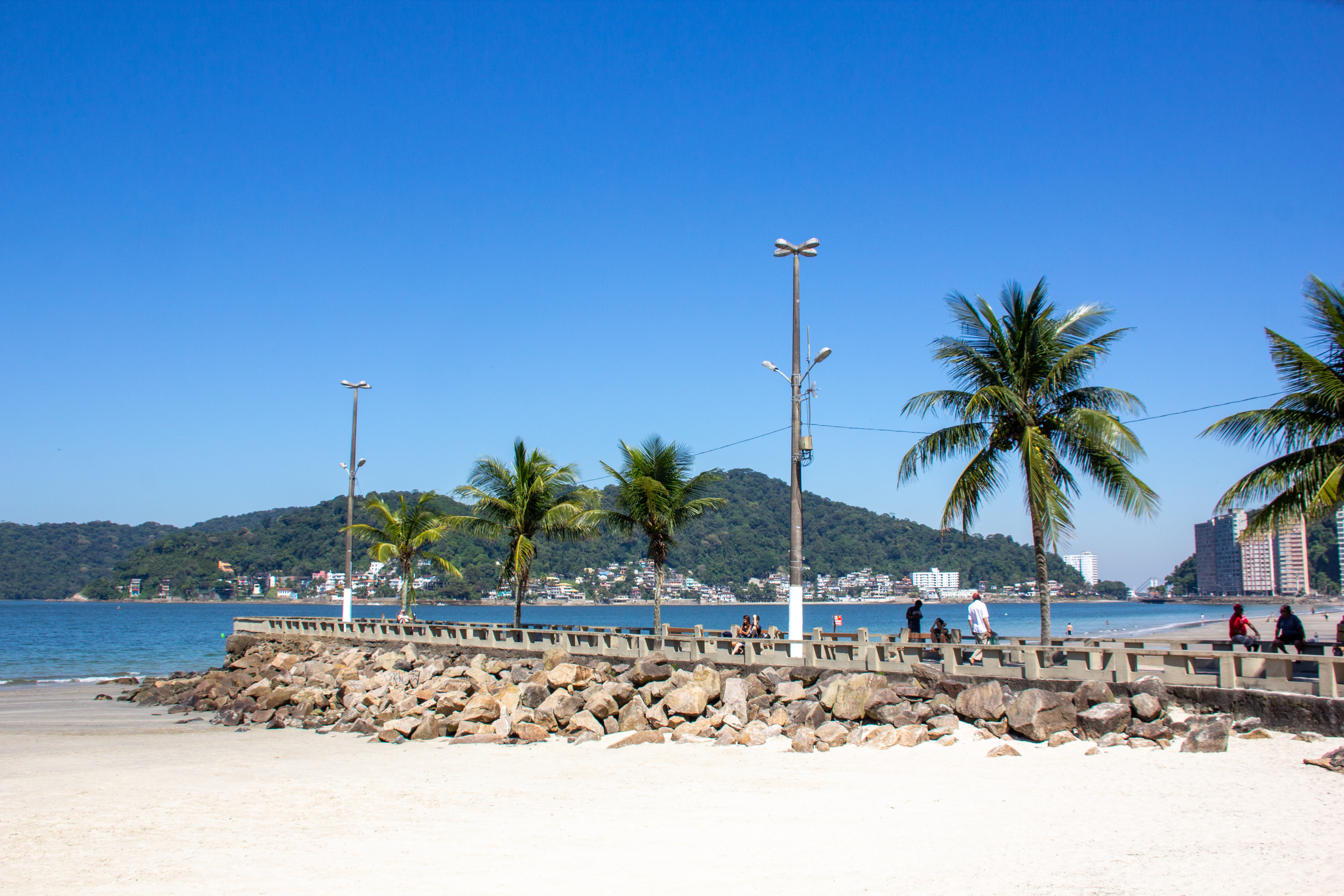
- Aerial view of Itararé Beach Pedra da Feiticeira View of Ponte Pênsil Marco Padrão Biquinha de Anchieta Cable car and Porchat Island The city from Morro do Voturuá Pelé Pier

- Flag Coat of arms
- Nicknames: Brazil's first village Cellula-Mater of Nationality; Birthplace of Democracy in the Americas
- Motto: Cellula Mater
- Location in São Paulo
- Coordinates: 23°57′48″S 46°23′32″W
- Country: Brazil
- State: São Paulo
- Region: Southeast
- Founded: January 22, 1532; 494 years ago
- Named for: Saint Vincent of Saragossa

Government
  - Mayor: Kayo Felype Nachtajler Amado (PODE)

Area
  - Total: 147.89 km^{2} (57.10 sq mi)
- Elevation: 6 m (20 ft)

Population (2022 Brazilian census)
  - Total: 329,911
  - Estimate (2025): 338,326
  - Density: 2,230.8/km^{2} (5,777.7/sq mi)
- Time zone: UTC−3 (BRT)
- HDI (2010): 0,768 – high
- Website: www.saovicente.sp.gov.br

São Vicente (after Saint Vincent of Saragossa, the patron Saint of Lisbon, Portugal) is a coastal municipality in southern São Paulo and the first city of Brazil. It is part of the Metropolitan Region of the Baixada Santista. The population is 329,911 (2022 census) in an area of 148.151 square kilometres (57.20 square miles).

Founded in 1532, by the Portuguese explorer and colonial administrator Martim Afonso de Sousa, it is the first permanent colonial settlement established in Brazil, and the first colonial election on the American continent also took place there. Because of this, it is considered the "cradle of American democracy".

São Vicente is one of the 15 municipalities in São Paulo considered seaside resorts by the state of São Paulo, as they meet certain prerequisites defined by State Law. This status guaranteed the municipality a larger budget from the State to promote regional tourism. Furthermore, the municipality acquires the right to add, next to its name, the title of "Estância Balneária" (Balneary Resort), a term by which it is designated both by official municipal records and by state references. Historical tourism and beach tourism are among the most relevant sectors of its economy.

== History ==
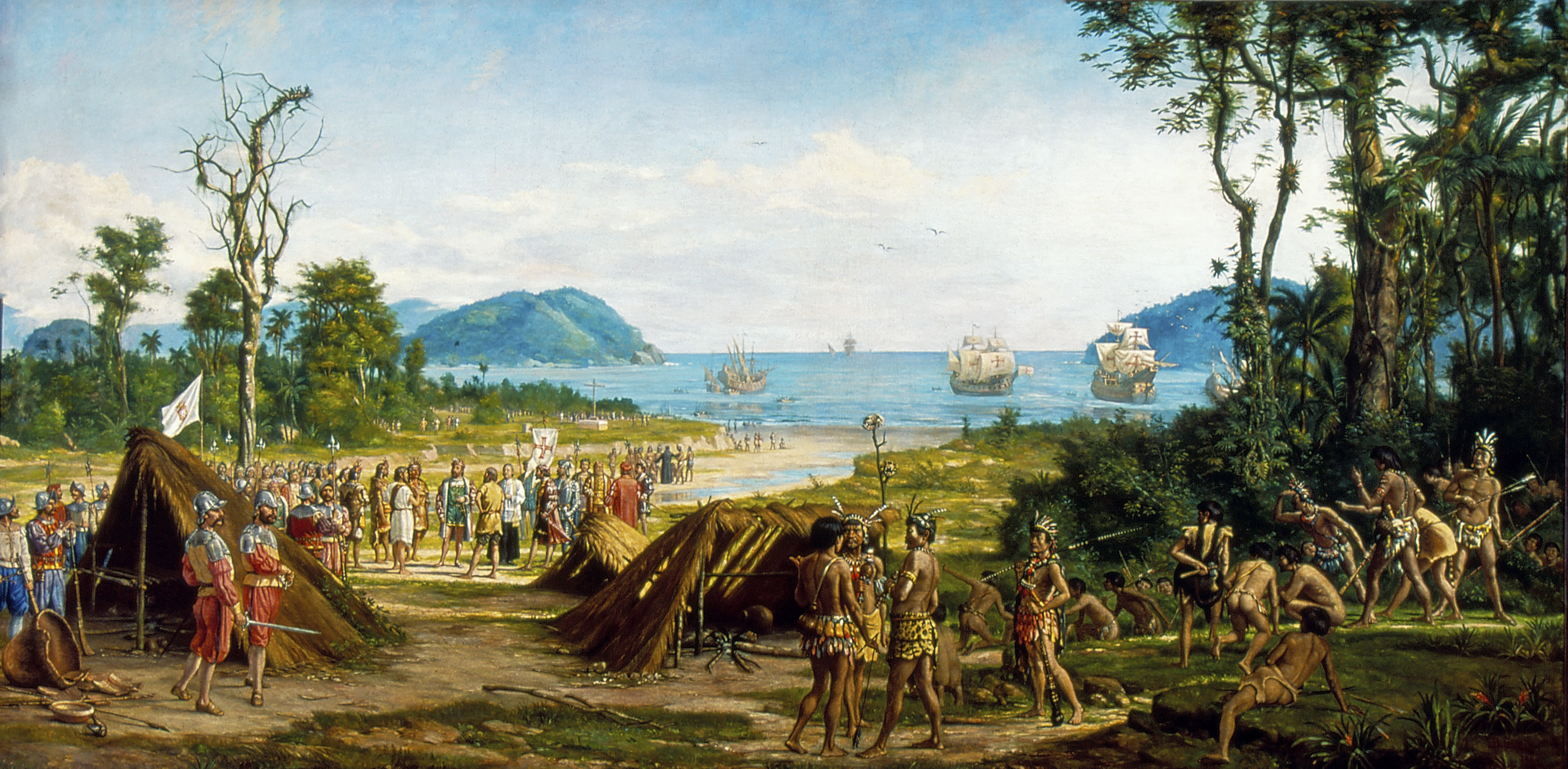
Foundation of São Vicente (Benedito Calixto)

It was the first permanent Portuguese settlement in the Americas and the first capital of the Captaincy of São Vicente, roughly the present state of São Paulo. Established as a proper village in 1532 by Martim Afonso de Sousa on what was then the Porto dos Escravos ("Port of the Slaves"), operated by three Portuguese colonists who trafficked on slaves captured by allied tribes, São Vicente is titled Cellula Mater (Mother Cell) of Brazil for being the first organized town in the country. The first City Council of all the Americas was democratically elected and established in São Vicente on 22 August 1532.

A battle took place here on 3 February 1583 when three English warships attempting to trade with the Portuguese, was set upon by three Spanish galleons. The Spanish ships were repelled and retreated leaving one galleon sunk.

== Geography ==
São Vicente is located on the western half of coastal São Vicente Island, being mostly a bedroom community for the larger and wealthier neighbouring port and commercial city of Santos on the island's eastern half. A small north–south hill range separates for the most part the two cities' urban areas, but they are contiguous in the north and on a narrow beach strip in the south. A narrow strip of land of the basin of the small Cubatão River extends west out of the central area of São Vicente, north and parallel to the municipality of Praia Grande.

São Vicente Suspension Bridge, linking the island to Praia Grande on the mainland, was constructed in 1914; a second link, the Mar Pequeno Bridge, was opened in 1981. São Vicente is linked to the capital city of São Paulo by the Imigrantes Highway and to the southern coast by the Manuel da Nóbrega Highway. São Vicente has a small fishing industry in its portion on the mainland, where there are a few small settlements.

== Noted places ==
The Monument of 500 years of Brazil (Monumento dos 500 anos do Brasil) is a viewing platform on Porchat Island, an islet which extends from the south of São Vicente Island. The platform was designed by the architect Oscar Niemeyer (1907–2012). It faces roughly north in an imaginary line to the National Congress in Brasília, completed by Niemeyer and others in 1960. The municipality contains part of the 901 hectares (2,230 acres) Xixová-Japuí State Park, created in 1993.

== Population history ==
Year	Population
2003	314,312
2004	321,474
2015	355,542
2022	329,911

== Transport ==
The Baixada Santista region is connected to Greater São Paulo by highway through the Anchieta-Imigrantes System. The Imigrantes Highway reaches the municipality, crossing the urban island area and heading towards Praia Grande by crossing the Canal dos Barreiros via the Ponte do Mar Pequeno. Towards the South Coast, starting from the Imigrantes Highway, there is the Padre Manoel da Nóbrega Highway, which crosses the entire continental portion of the municipality between Serra do Mar and the Samaritá plain. The municipality is crossed from east to west on the island and on the continental part by the lines of América Latina Logística – ALL (former network of Ferrovia Paulista – FEPASA), which, heading west, connects São Vicente with Praia Grande, Mongaguá, Itanhaém and Peruíbe; heading east with Santos and heading north, it reaches the Planalto Paulistano, to the south of Greater São Paulo, in Embu-Guaçu.

The Suspension Bridge was built in 1914 and was designed by engineer Saturnino de Brito, who at the time applied German sewage drainage technology to the Itaipu Bridge. Today, it connects the island of São Vicente to the mainland, providing access to the municipality of Praia Grande, and is also one of the city's main tourist attractions due to its beauty.

== Media ==
In telecommunications, the city was served by the Telecomunicações de São Paulo. In July 1998, this company was acquired by Telefónica, which adopted the Vivo brand in 2012. The company is currently an operator of cell phones, fixed lines, internet (fiber optics/4G) and television (satellite and cable).

== Notable people ==
- Wlamir Marques, basketball player, Olympic medallist and World Champion
- Cosmo Alexandre, kickboxer and mixed martial artist
- Larissa Pimenta, judoka
- Jefferson, footballer
- Robinho, footballer

== International relations ==
São Vicente is twinned with:

- Naha, Okinawa, Japan

== See also ==
- List of municipalities in São Paulo

== Bibliography ==
- "Do Litoral ao Planalto". História do Brasil: Área Vicentina.
- Lawrence, Rachel (January 2010). Alyse Dar (ed.). Brazil (Seventh ed.). Apa Publications GmbH & Co. / Discovery Channel. pp. 183–204.
