= Praia Grande Pride =

LGBTQ event in Brazil

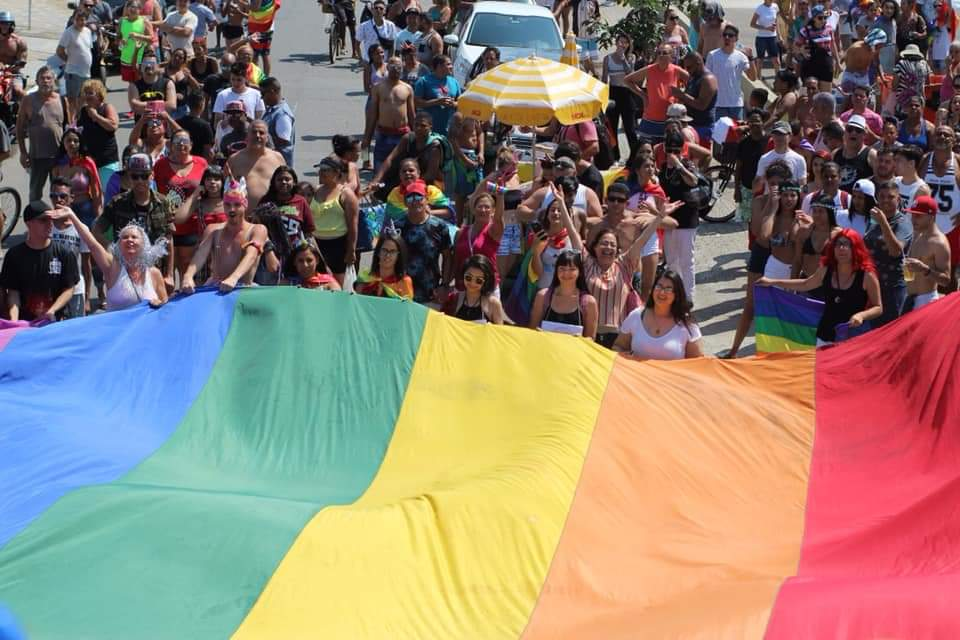
- First edition in 2018
- Native name: Parada do Orgulho LGBT de Praia Grande
- Date: 23 September 2018
- Location: Praia Grande, Brazil
- Website: www.paradapg.org.br

The Praia Grande LGBT Pride Parade (Brazilian Portuguese: Parada do Orgulho LGBT de Praia Grande) is a pride event that has been taking place in the Brazilian municipality of Praia Grande since 2018. The event includes the participation of the LGBTQ community, supporters, and people passing by. One of the main demands included in the event has been the fight against LGBTphobia.

In its first edition, on 23 September 2018, the Praia Grande Pride Parade brought together approximately 70,000 people, with the theme "Uma onda de amor contra o preconceito" (lit. 'A wave of love against prejudice'). In 2018, the NGO Associação da Parada do Orgulho LGBT de Praia Grande (APOLGBT/PG), the event's organizer, changed the name to Parada do Orgulho LGBT de Praia Grande. As of 2026, the event is considered the largest pride parade on the coast of the state of São Paulo.
