= São Vicente Suspension Bridge =

São Vicente Suspension Bridge Ponte Pênsil de São Vicente
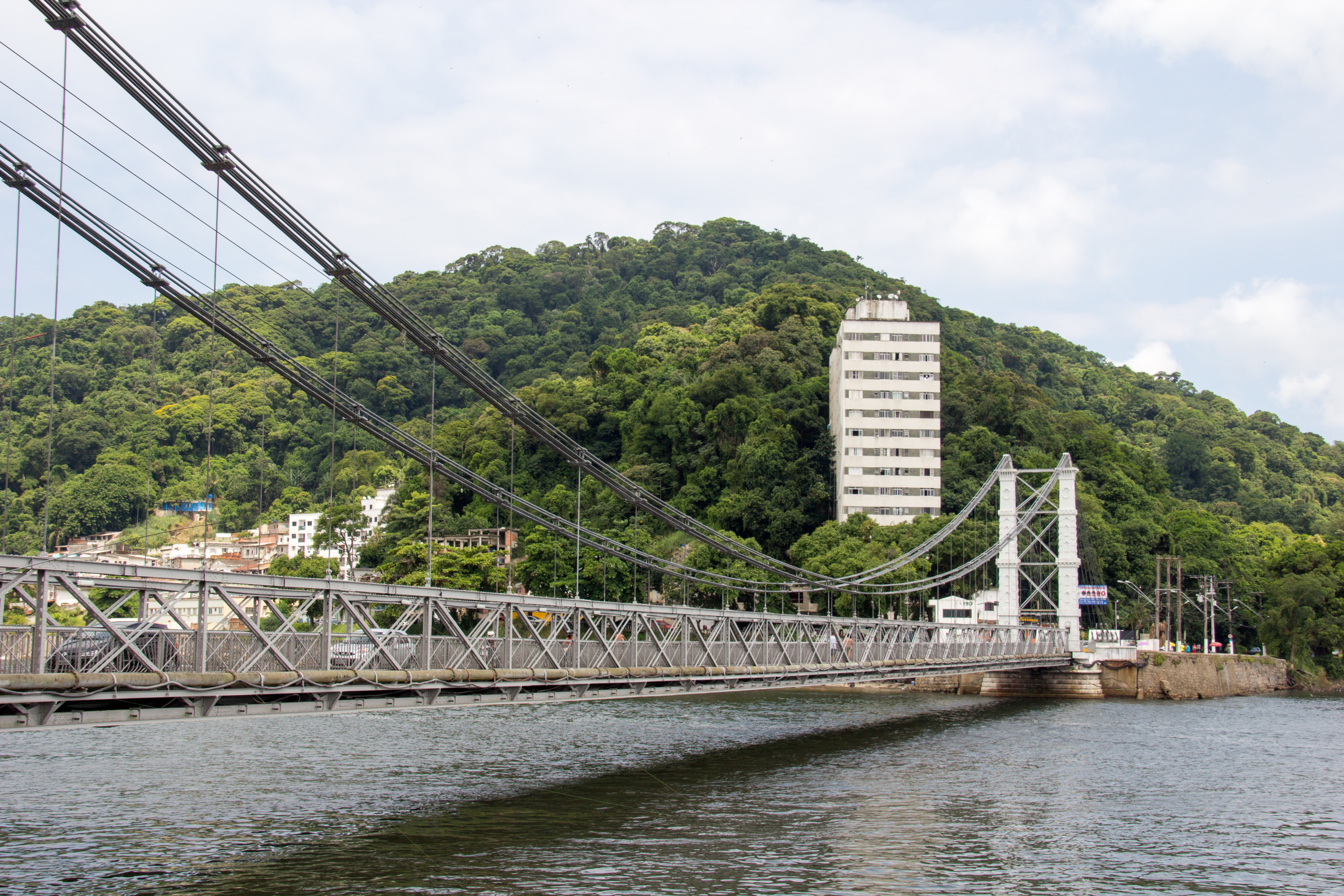
- The bridge in 2017
- Coordinates: 23°58′32″S 46°23′20″W
- Crosses: Atlantic Ocean
- Locale: São Vicente
- Maintained by: São Paulo State Government

Characteristics
- Design: Suspension bridge
- Material: Wood, steel cables
- Total length: 180 metres (590 ft)
- Width: 6.4 metres (21 ft)
- Height: 23 metres (75 ft)
- Longest span: 180 metres (590 ft)
- Load limit: 60 tons
- Clearance below: 6.5 to 4 metres (21 to 13 ft)

History
- Engineering design by: Saturnino de Brito
- Inaugurated: 21 or 24 May 1914

Statistics
- Toll: No

Location
- Interactive map of São Vicente Suspension Bridge

São Vicente Suspension Bridge (Portuguese: Ponte Pênsil de São Vicente) is a suspension bridge in São Vicente, São Paulo, Brazil. It was one of the first suspension bridges in Brazil, and carries vehicle and pedestrian traffic between Morro dos Barbosas and Japuí. Originally conceived in 1910 as a way to carry sewage away from the city of Santos and São Vicente, construction started in 1911, and the bridge opened in May 1914. It was restored in 2015, with the corroded load-bearing cables replaced along with other repair work.

== Location ==
The bridge is located in São Vicente, in the Metropolitan Region of Baixada Santista, the State of São Paulo, Brazil. It connects the mainland to an island, and it is between Morro dos Barbosas and Japuí and it is regularly used by residents of Japuí and Prainha. It connects São Vicente with Praia Grande, between Avenidas Presidente Getúlio Vargas and Engenheiro Saturnino de Brito.

== Construction ==
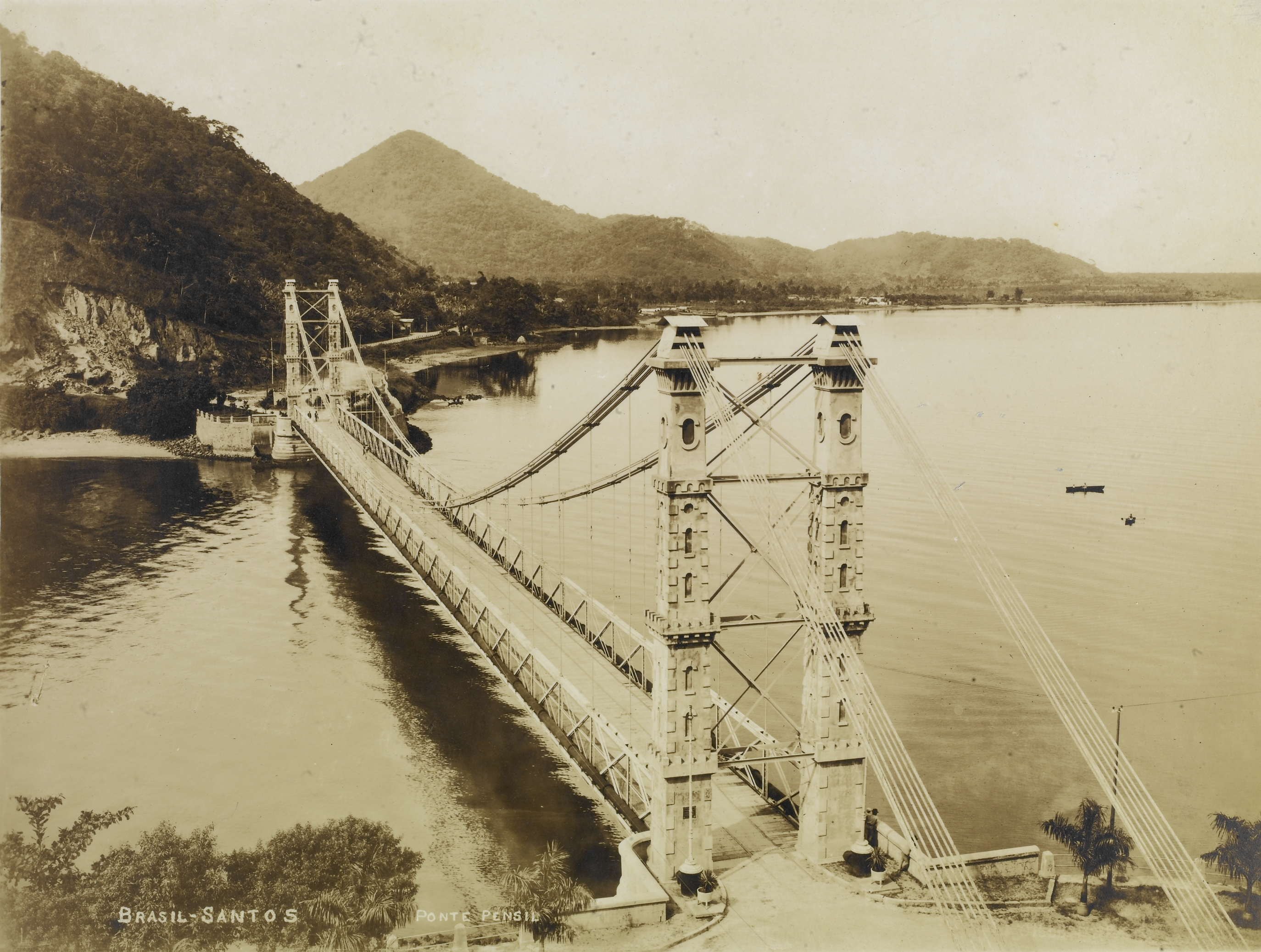
The bridge in 1910-1915

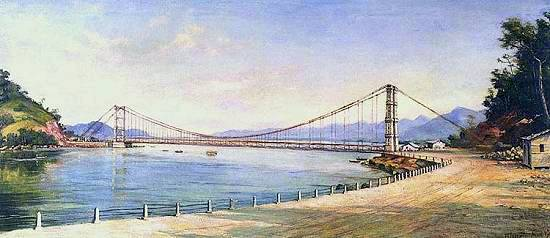
The bridge in 1914

The bridge was first proposed in 1910 by the Sanitation Commission of Santos, led by Francisco Saturnino de Brito, to support a sewage pipeline from Santos and São Vicente to the Atlantic Ocean at the Itaipu point in Praia Grande. Detailed plans were subsequently commissioned, led by Miguel Presgrave, with the Trajano and Medeiros & Cia companies. The project for the bridge was developed by August Kloenne.

The pontoons for the bridge were installed in 1911. The material for the bridge was imported from Germany, and arrived on ten ships. It was inaugurated on 21 or 24 May 1914, with Washington Luís (then Mayor of São Paulo) being the first person to cross the bridge in a car.

The bridge is 6.4 metres (21 ft) wide and has a span of 180 metres (590 ft) between its towers. It is 6.5 to 4 metres (21 to 13 ft) above the height of the sea depending on the tide. It is suspended on 16 steel cables, with four anchor blocks and four concrete-covered metal towers that are 20 metres (66 ft) high. It can carry a maximum load of 60 tons. It was one of the first suspension bridges in Brazil. It was constructed in an era when concrete was not available, and has a wooden floor. As well as providing a transportation link, it also improved the sewage disposal in the area.

The maintenance and conservation of the bridge has been supported by Instituto de Pesquisas Tecnológicas since 1936, when a static load test was carried out to assess whether the bridge could be used to carry vehicles. Tests of the corrosion of the steel cables, and subsequent reinforcement, took place in the 1940s.

The bridge was registered by CONDEPHAAT on 30 April 1982.

== Restoration ==
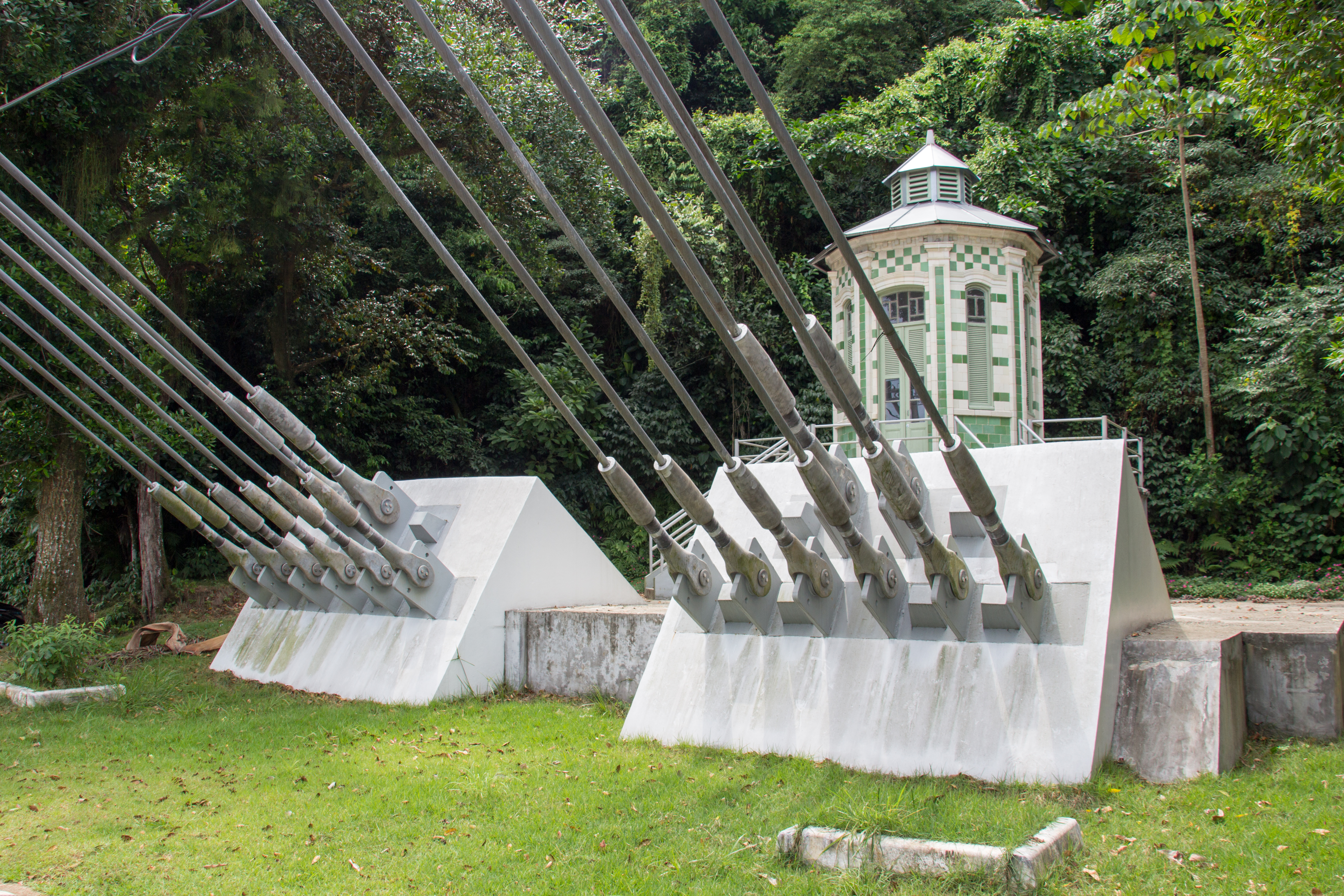
The cable anchors on the northern shore

In the 1990s the wooden floor was replaced, and the condition of the steel cables was checked, in order to enable vehicular travel over the bridge. At the time the original steel cables were starting to corrode.

In 2013 a project to completely restore the bridge was started, led by Engeti. Sixteen of the cables were replaced, with provisional cables held by temporary towers next to the main ones, until the new cables, which were imported from Italy, could be installed. The towers were also repaired, the wooden floor was replaced, and the structure was blasted and repainted with corrosion-resistant paint. The pavements were separated from the road and made more accessible during the restoration.

The restoration was the fifth restoration of a cable suspension bridge in the world, and the first time this bridge had been restored. While steel cables on suspension bridges have been replaced in China, Africa and Scotland, this was the first such replacement in Brazil.

It was originally scheduled to be reopened on its centenary in 2014. However, its reopening was delayed six times due to the complexity of the repair work. The first delay was due to cracks appearing in the blocks that support the cables. It ultimately reopened on 30 October 2015, with an opening ceremony attended by Geraldo Alckmin, Governor of São Paulo. The restoration ultimately took 27 months and cost R$33 million. The lighting, which was due to be replaced in partnership with the City Hall, was not replaced by the time of the opening, with the existing lighting being maintained instead. The new lighting was installed in November 2016. A police base was also planned to be installed by Concrejato on the Japuí side of the bridge, for the Military Police, Municipal Civil Guard, and Transport Police, but was not ready by the time of the reopening.

The bridge is used by 12,000 residents of the local area, who had to use the Ponte do Mar Pequeno while it was being restored. It is a landmark of the São Vicente. It is often used by young locals to jump into the sea, some of whom have gone missing after jumping from the bridge. In response to this, the São Paulo State Government recently decided to prohibit jumping from the bridge and placed warning signs to alert pedestrians.
