= Gazis =

Gazis (Greek: Γαζῆς, derived from the Arabic Ghazi) is a Greek surname. It is the surname of:

- Anthimos Gazis (1758–1828), Greek philosopher.
- Georgios Gazis (born 1981), Greek amateur boxer.
- Nikolaos Gazis, Greek politician and MEP.
- Theodoros Gazis (1398–1475), Greek humanist and translator of Aristotle.
