= Jack Culcay =

German boxer (born 1985)

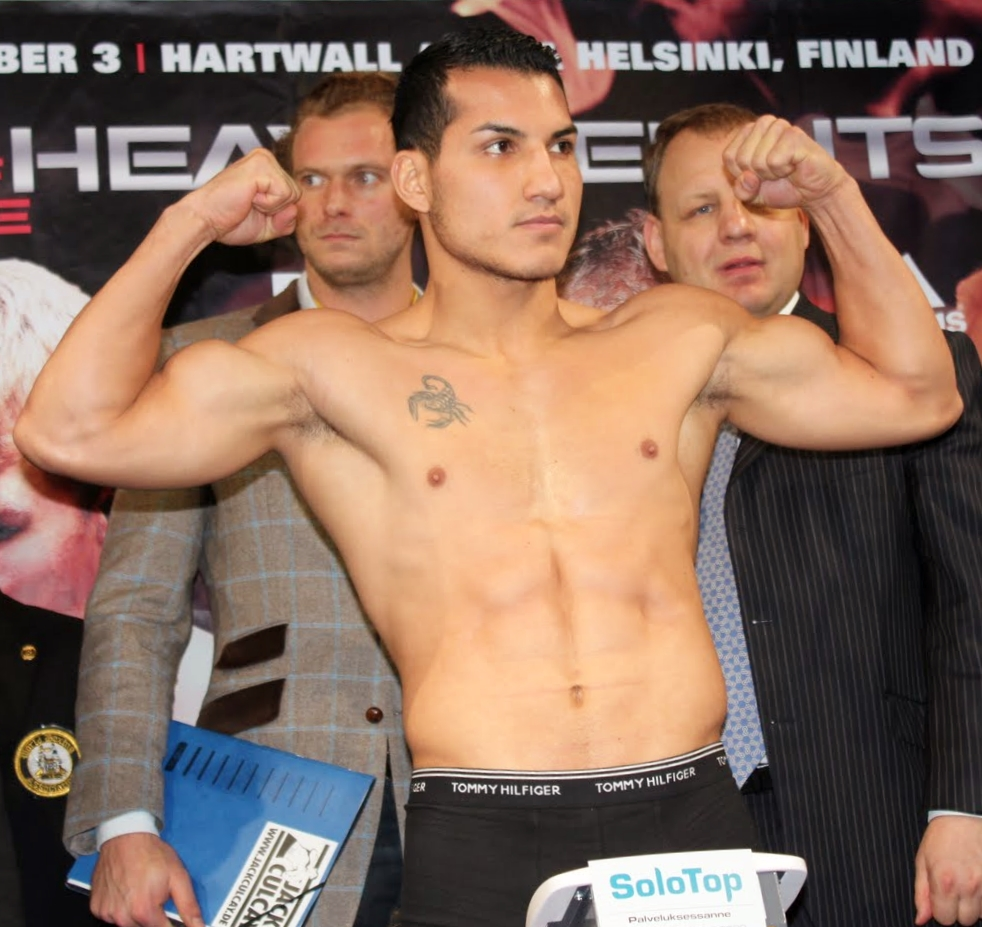
- Culcay in 2011

Personal information
- Nickname: Golden Jack
- Nationality: German
- Born: Jack Robert Culcay-Keth; 26 September 1985 (age 41) Ambato, Ecuador
- Height: 5 ft 7 in (170 cm)
- Weight: Light middleweight; Middleweight

Boxing career
- Reach: 65 in (165 cm)
- Stance: Orthodox

Boxing record
- Total fights: 38
- Wins: 33
- Win by KO: 14
- Losses: 5
Medal record
Men's Boxing
Representing Germany
European Championships
Silver medal – second place	2008 Liverpool	Welterweight
World Championships
Gold medal – first place	2009 Milan	Welterweight

Jack Robert Culcay-Keth (born 26 September 1985) is an Ecuadorian-born German retired professional boxer. As an amateur he represented Germany, fighting at the 2008 Summer Olympics in the welterweight division, and winning a silver medal at the 2008 European Championships and gold at the 2009 World Championships. He held the WBA interim light-middleweight title between 2015 and 2017.

== Amateur career ==
Culcay took up boxing at the behest of his father in 1998, training at TG 75 Darmstadt. He was relatively unknown in 2007, when he was sent to the 2007 World Amateur Boxing Championships. But while all the German top fighters exited early he and middleweight Konstantin Buga were the only ones to reach the quarterfinal and qualify for the 2008 Summer Olympics. At the World Championships, Culcay beat Jetmir Kuci and Zoran Mitrovic then he lost to eventual American winner Demetrius Andrade. At the Olympics he was edged out in his first bout by Kim Jung-Joo. Culcay went on to win a gold medal at the 2009 World Championships, beating Andrey Zamkovoy in the final match.

== Professional career ==
Culcay turned pro in 2009. He is promoted by Sauerland Promotions. He won his first 14 fights, before losing a split decision to Guido Pitto. Culcay avenged the loss with a narrow unanimous decision win in his next fight. Culcay claimed the European light-middleweight title in August 2014, beating Isaac Real on points.

=== Culcay vs. Weber ===
In May 2015, Culcay faced Maurice Weber for the WBA interim light-middleweight title. Culcay won the bout and the title by unanimous decision.

=== Culcay vs. Andrade ===
After two successful defenses, Culcay reached an agreement to fight former world champion Demetrius Andrade. The winner would be elevated to WBA (Regular) champion. The fight took place in March 2017 at the Friedrich-Ebert-Halle in Ludwigshafen, Germany. Andrade won by split decision. Two judges scored the bout 116–112, 116–112 for Andrade whilst the third had it 115–114 for Culcay. The fight was regarded as close, with as many as five rounds being tossed between the two. Sky Sports pundits had Andrade a clear close winner as he outworked Culcay. In the post fight interview, Andrade credited his performance, "I thought I did everything that I needed to do. I came to Germany and took the title. Culcay came like a champion, but I was the better man. I outlanded him and I came out with the victory."

=== Culcay vs. Cospolite ===
On June 12, 2020, Culcay fought Howard Cospolite. While Cospolite performed well in some rounds of the bout, Culcay was overall more efficient and managed to outland Cospolite. This deserved Culcay a unanimous decision win, scoring 118-110, 117-111 and 116-112 on the scorecards.

=== Culcay vs. Baraou ===
In his next bout, Culcay faced IBF #7-ranked and WBC #13-ranked Abass Baraou. In a very close fight, Culcay managed to do enough to win the but in the eyes of two of the judges, who scored the fight 116-113 and 115-114 in favor of Culcay while the third judge saw Baraou as the winner 115-113, result in a split-decision win for the former world champion.

=== Culcay vs. Murtazaliev ===
Culcay faced Bakhram Murtazaliev for the vacant IBF light-middleweight title at Stadthalle in Falkensee, Germany, on 6 April 2024, but lost when he was knocked out in the 11th round.

=== Retirement ===
Culcay announced his retirement from professional boxing in September 2024.

== Professional boxing record ==
38 fights	33 wins	5 losses
By knockout	14	1
By decision	19	4

No.	Result	Record	Opponent	Type	Round, time	Date	Location	Notes
38	Loss	33–5	Bakhram Murtazaliev	KO	11 (12), 2:50	6 Apr 2024	Stadthalle, Falkensee, Germany	For vacant IBF light middleweight title
37	Win	33–4	Juan Adrian Monzon	KO	2 (8), 0:51	1 Jul 2023	Unihalle Wuppertal, Wuppertal, Germany	
36	Win	32–4	Damiano Falcinelli	UD	8	12 Nov 2022	AGON Sportpark, Berlin, Germany	
35	Win	31–4	Emanuele Cavallucci	UD	10	2 Jul 2022	Stadtwerke Arena, Erding, Germany	
34	Win	30–4	Khalil El Harraz	UD	10	11 Mar 2022	AGON Sportpark, Berlin, Germany	
33	Win	29–4	Abass Baraou	SD	12	28 Aug 2020	Havelstudios, Berlin, Germany	
32	Win	28–4	Howard Cospolite	UD	12	12 Jun 2020	Havelstudios, Berlin, Germany	Retained WBO International light-middleweight title
31	Win	27–4	Jama Saidi	UD	12	23 Nov 2019	Arena Berlin, Berlin, Germany	Won WBO International light-middleweight title
30	Win	26–4	Stefano Castellucci	UD	8	15 Jun 2019	Sport and Congress Center, Schwerin, Germany	
29	Loss	25–4	Sergiy Derevyanchenko	UD	12	13 Apr 2019	Minneapolis Armory, Minneapolis, Minnesota, U.S.	
28	Win	25–3	Rafael Bejaran	TKO	10 (12), 1:25	22 Sep 2018	MBS Arena, Potsdam, Germany	Won vacant IBF International middleweight title
27	Win	24–3	Adasat Rodriguez	TKO	6 (12), 0:55	9 Jun 2018	Kohlrabizirkus, Leipzig, Germany	Won vacant European Union middleweight title
26	Win	23–3	Craig Cunningham	UD	8	10 Mar 2018	Stadthalle, Gütersloh, Germany	
25	Loss	22–3	Maciej Sulęcki	UD	10	21 Oct 2017	Prudential Center, Newark, New Jersey, U.S.	
24	Loss	22–2	Demetrius Andrade	SD	12	11 Mar 2017	Friedrich-Ebert-Halle, Ludwigshafen, Germany	Lost WBA (Regular) light-middleweight title
23	Win	22–1	Jean Carlos Prada	RTD	9 (12), 3:00	9 Apr 2016	MBS Arena, Potsdam, Germany	Retained WBA interim light-middleweight title
22	Win	21–1	Dennis Hogan	UD	12	5 Dec 2015	Inselparkhalle, Hamburg, Germany	Retained WBA interim light-middleweight title
21	Win	20–1	Maurice Weber	UD	12	9 May 2015	Festhalle, Frankfurt, Germany	Won WBA interim light-middleweight title
20	Win	19–1	Karim Merroudj	UD	12	6 Dec 2014	EWE Arena, Oldenburg, Germany	Retained European light-middleweight title
19	Win	18–1	Isaac Real	UD	12	16 Aug 2014	Messehalle, Erfurt, Germany	Retained WBA Inter-Continental light-middleweight title; Won European light-middleweight title
18	Win	17–1	Salim Larbi	UD	12	05 Apr 2014	Stadthalle, Rostock, Germany	Retained WBA Inter-Continental light-middleweight title
17	Win	16–1	Dieudonne Belinga	UD	12	14 Dec 2013	Jahnsportforum, Neubrandenburg, Germany	Retained WBA Inter-Continental light-middleweight title
16	Win	15–1	Guido Nicolas Pitto	UD	12	26 Oct 2013	EWE Arena, Oldenburg, Germany	Won WBA Inter-Continental light-middleweight title
15	Loss	14–1	Guido Nicolas Pitto	SD	12	27 Apr 2013	Alsterdorfer Sporthalle, Hamburg, Germany	Lost WBA Inter-Continental light-middleweight title
14	Win	14–0	Jean Michel Hamilcaro	TKO	5 (12), 2:26	15 Dec 2012	Nuremberg Arena, Nuremberg, Germany	Retained WBA Inter-Continental light-middleweight title
13	Win	13–0	Mark Thompson	TKO	5 (12), 2:48	29 Sep 2012	Alsterdorfer Sporthalle, Hamburg, Germany	Retained WBA Inter-Continental light-middleweight title
12	Win	12–0	Frederic Serre	TKO	3 (12), 2:04	25 Aug 2012	O2 World Arena, Berlin, Germany	Won vacant WBA Inter-Continental light-middleweight title
11	Win	11–0	Salvatore Annunziata	TKO	7 (8), 2:38	25 Feb 2012	Porsche-Arena, Stuttgart, Germany	
10	Win	10–0	Giammario Grassellini	KO	1 (10), 0:48	3 Dec 2011	Hartwall Areena, Helsinki, Finland	
9	Win	9–0	Dee Mitchell	UD	10	3 Sep 2011	Herning Kongrescenter, Herning, Denmark	
8	Win	8–0	Mikheil Khutsishvili	KO	3 (8), 2:31	9 Apr 2011	Bordelandhalle, Magdeburg, Germany	
7	Win	7–0	Alexey Ribchev	UD	8	19 Nov 2010	Universum Gym, Hamburg, Germany	
6	Win	6–0	Ionut Trandafir Ilie	TKO	4 (6) 2:18	31 Jul 2010	O2 World, Hamburg, Germany	
5	Win	5–0	Omar Siala	UD	6	3 Jul 2010	Porsche-Arena, Stuttgart, Germany	
4	Win	4–0	Isak Tavares	TKO	1 (6), 2:23	22 May 2010	Stadthalle, Rostock, Germany	
3	Win	3–0	Sylvestre Marianini	TKO	1 (4), 2:27	24 Apr 2010	Alsterdorfer Sporthalle, Hamburg, Germany	
2	Win	2–0	Dmitrij Sidorovic	TKO	1 (4), 2:30	9 Jan 2010	Bordelandhalle, Magdeburg, Germany	
1	Win	1–0	Jindrich Kubin	UD	4	19 Dec 2009	Sport and Congress Center, Schwerin, Germany	

== See also ==
- List of world light-middleweight boxing champions

Sporting positions
Regional boxing titles
Vacant Title last held by Sergey Rabchenko	WBA Inter-Continental light-middleweight champion 25 August 2012 – 27 April 2013	Succeeded by Guido Nicolas Pitto
Preceded by Guido Nicolas Pitto	WBA Inter-Continental light-middleweight champion 26 October 2013 – 9 May 2015; Won interim title	Vacant Title next held by Brandon Cook
Preceded by Isaac Real	EBU light-middleweight champion 16 August 2014 – 9 May 2015; Won interim title	Vacant Title next held by Cédric Vitu
Vacant Title last held by Rubén Díaz	EBU European Union middleweight champion 9 June 2018 – 2018; Vacated	Vacant Title next held by Anderson Prestot
Vacant Title last held by Francis Lafrenière	IBF International middleweight champion 22 September 2018 – 2019; Vacated	Vacant Title next held by Marcos Nader
Vacant Title last held by Magomed Kurbanov	WBO International light-middleweight champion 23 November 2019 – 2021; Vacated	Vacant Title next held by Magomed Kurbanov
World boxing titles
Vacant Title last held by Erislandy Lara	WBA light-middleweight champion Interim title 9 May 2015 – 8 June 2016; Promoted	Vacant Title next held by Brian Castaño
Preceded by Erislandy Lara; Status changed	WBA light-middleweight champion Regular title 8 June 2016 – 11 March 2017	Succeeded by Demetrius Andrade
