= Boxing at the 2010 South American Games – Men's 75kg =

The Men's 75 kg event at the 2010 South American Games had its quarterfinals held on March 23, the semifinals on March 25 and the final on March 27.

== Medalists ==
Gold	Silver	Bronze
Alfonso Blanco; Venezuela	Alex Theran; Colombia	Jaime Cortes Padilla; Ecuador; Yamaguchi Florentino; Brazil

== Results ==
Quarterfinals
Oscar Guedes (URU)	1
Jaime Cortes Padilla (ECU)	13
Alfonso Blanco (VEN)	RSC
Gustavo Caicedo (PAN)

Semifinals
Yamaguchi Florentino (BRA)	10
Alex Theran (COL)	16
Jaime Cortes Padilla (ECU)	1
Alfonso Blanco (VEN)	3

Final
Alex Theran (COL)	2
Alfonso Blanco (VEN)	4
