= Ricardo Akinobu Yamauti =

Brazilian politician (1949–2021)

Mayor of Praia Grande
- In office 1997–2000
- Preceded by: Alberto Mourão
- Succeeded by: Alberto Mourão

Vice-Mayor of Praia Grande
- In office 1993–1996
- Succeeded by: Alexandre Evaristo Cunha

Personal details
- Born: 22 October 1949 São Paulo, Brazil
- Died: 3 January 2021 (aged 71) Praia Grande, Brazil
- Political party: PSDB

Ricardo Akinobu Yamauti (22 October 1949 – 3 January 2021) was a Brazilian politician, civil engineer, and businessman.

== Biography ==
Yamauti served as Vice-Mayor of Praia Grande in the first term of Alberto Mourão. He was elected Mayor in 1996 with 79.5% of votes, one of the highest margins in the country. During his tenure, he expanded the Biblioteca Presidente Médici and bringing it to the Dewey Decimal Classification system. He also expanded the arts, writing, and cultural activities in the city. The main criticism of his government was that much of the economic advancement in the city was brought from the outside, with the hiring of autonomous teachers and professors, taking jobs away from local teachers already living there.

In addition to his political career, Yamauti served as Regional Director for SindusCon-SP in the State of São Paulo. He also served as President of the Agência Metropolitana da Baixada Santista.

Ricardo Akinobu Yamauti died of COVID-19 in Praia Grande on 3 January 2021, at the age of 71 during the COVID-19 pandemic in Brazil.
