= Yamaguchi Falcão =

Brazilian boxer (born 1988)

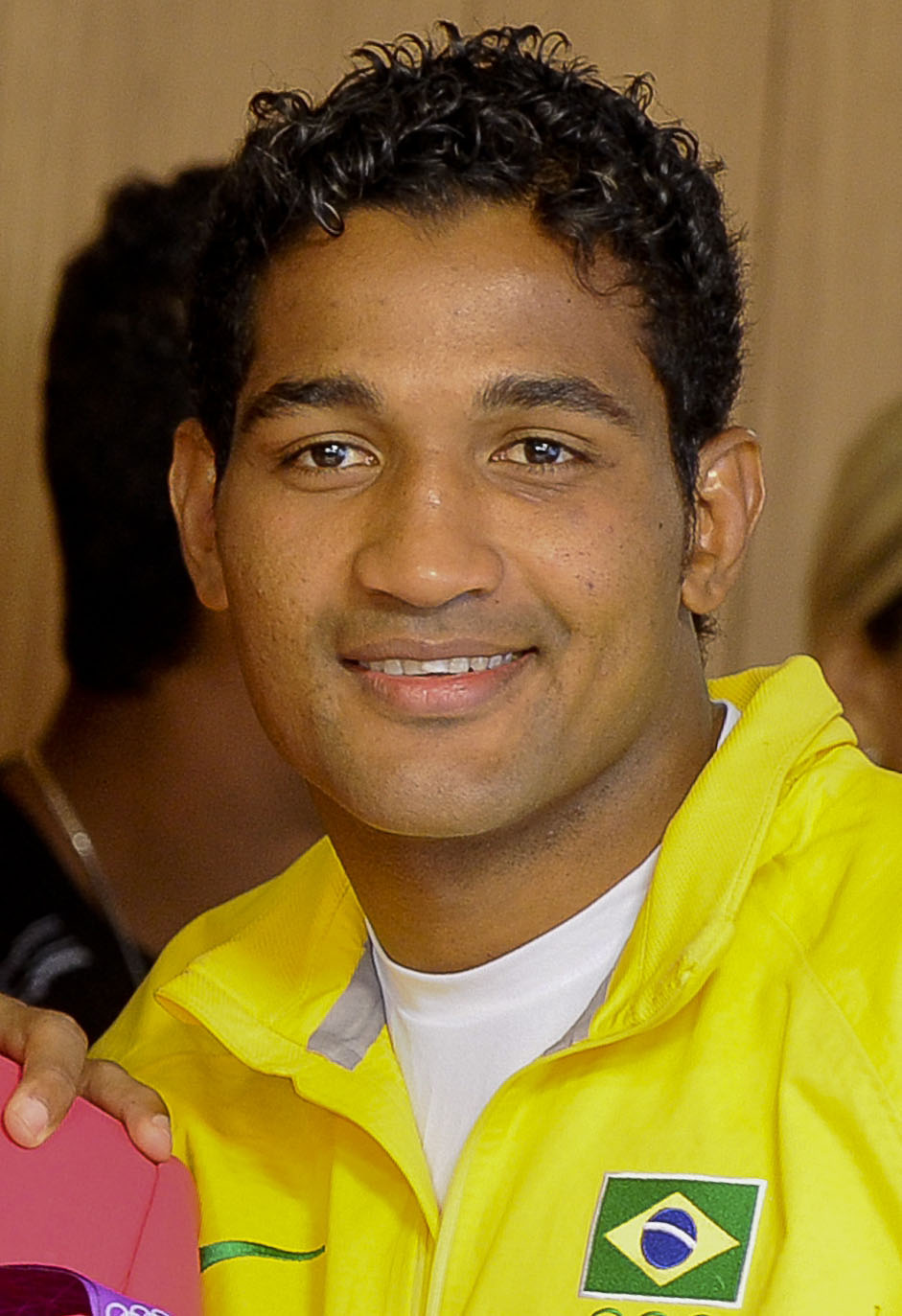

Personal information
- Nationality: Brazilian
- Born: Yamaguchi Falcão Florentino; January 24, 1988 (age 38) São Mateus, Espírito Santo
- Height: 1.81 m (5 ft 11 in)
- Weight: Middleweight; Super middleweight Cruiserweight

Boxing career
- Reach: 74 in (188 cm)
- Stance: Southpaw

Boxing record
- Total fights: 28
- Wins: 24
- Win by KO: 10
- Losses: 2
- Draws: 1
- No contests: 1
Medal record
Olympic Games
Bronze medal – third place	2012 London	Light heavyweight
Pan American Games
Silver medal – second place	2011 Guadalajara	Light Heavyweight
South American Games
Bronze medal – third place	2010 Medellin	Middleweight

Yamaguchi Falcão Florentino (born 24 January 1988) is a Brazilian professional boxer who has held multiple regional titles in the middleweight, super middleweight and cruiserweight divisions. In his amateur years, he won silver at the 2011 Panamerican Games and a bronze at the 2012 Olympics at light heavyweight.

== Early life ==
Born in São Mateus, Espírito Santo, Falcão is the older brother of professional boxer Esquiva Falcão.

== Amateur career ==
At the 2009 World Amateur Boxing Championships he beat two opponents at middleweight before losing 3:8 to eventual winner Abbos Atoev (UZB). At the 2010 South American Games he lost to Alex Theran but got a bronze anyway. Afterwards he moved up in weight. At the 2011 World Amateur Boxing Championships he beat Amine Azzouzi and Carlos Gongora, then lost to Elshod Rasulov. In Guadalajara at the PanAms he beat two opponents then lost to Cuban favorite Julio César la Cruz.

At the Olympic qualifier, he beat three opponents, including Osmar Bravo who also qualified, then lost the final to American southpaw Marcus Browne. All three made the Olympics. At the 2012 Olympics, he controversially edged out Sumit Sangwan 15:14, then Meng Fanlong 17:17, on countback before besting Cuban world champion Julio César la Cruz 18:15. He was defeated in the semi-finals by the Russian favorite Egor Mekhontsev 23:11 and received the bronze medal.

Unlike what his name suggests, he is not of Japanese descent.

== Professional career ==
On October 2, it was revealed that Falcão became a professional, signing with Golden Boy Promotions. In his debut, he was disqualified alongside Martín Fidel Ríos after the second round. Both fighters traded a few punches after the round ended followed by Ríos spitting on Falcão. The call was seen as excessive by both fighters, whom wanted to keep fighting. However, Falcão won all of his subsequent 11 fights. In the tenth, against Jorge Daniel Caraballo, Falcão won the WBC Latino middleweight title.

In 2023, at the age of 35, he faced Cuban David Morrell, current super middleweight champion (up to 76.2 kg), in the dispute for the World Boxing Association (WBA) belt. He was selected at the last minute to replace the Ghanaian Sena Agbeko, who had documentation problems and was left out of the match. The Brazilian had less than two weeks to prepare for the fight, where he felt the lack of rhythm against his rival, ten years younger, and fell in the first round. He was attempting to become the seventh Brazilian to be world boxing champion, joining Éder Jofre, Miguel de Oliveira, Acelino Freitas, Valdemir Pereira, Rose Volantê and Patrick Teixeira.

== Professional boxing record ==
30 fights	25 wins	3 losses
By knockout	10	1
By decision	15	2
Draws	1	
No contests	1	

Key to abbreviations used for results
DQ	Disqualification	RTD	Corner retirement
KO	Knockout	SD	Split decision / split draw
MD	Majority decision / majority draw	TD	Technical decision / technical draw
NC	No contest	TKO	Technical knockout
PTS	Points decision	UD	Unanimous decision / unanimous draw

Boxing record
No.	Result	Record	Opponent	Type	Round(s), time	Date	Location	Notes
30	Loss	25–3–1 (1)	Hebert Conceição	UD	10	27 Sep 2025	ARCA Spaces, São Paulo, Brazil	For Brazilian super middleweight title and vacant WBO Latino super middleweight title
29	Win	25–2–1 (1)	Sergio Santos Dantas	UD	8	12 Jul 2025	Matrix Music Hall, Cariacica, Brazil	Catchweight (82 kg) bout; Originally scheduled for 10 rounds, but reduced during the bout
28	Loss	24–2–1 (1)	David Morrell	KO	1 (12), 2:22	22 Apr 2023	T-Mobile Arena, Las Vegas, Nevada, US	For WBA (Regular) super middleweight title
27	Win	24–1–1 (1)	Ernest Amuzu	TKO	7 (10), 0:49	11 Dec 2022	Caribe Royale Orlando, Orlando, Florida, US	
26	Win	23–1-1 (1)	Alex Theran	UD	10	29 Oct 2022	Lowell Memorial Auditorium, Lowell, Massachusetts, US	Retained WBC Latino and NABA super middleweight titles
25	Win	22–1–1 (1)	Abel Nicolas Adriel	UD	8	17 Oct 2022	Alessi Gym Fitness Center, Tampa, Florida, US	
24	Win	21–1–1 (1)	Damian Ezequiel Bonelli	UD	10	26 Mar 2022	Caribe Royale Orlando, Orlando, Florida, US	Won vacant NABA super middleweight title
23	Win	20–1–1 (1)	Fernando Ezequiel Farias	KO	2 (10), 1:21	19 Feb 2022	Melrose Hall, Melrose, Massachusetts, US	Won vacant WBC Latino super middleweight title
22	Win	19–1–1 (1)	Jorge Daniel Miranda	UD	9	23 Oct 2021	Raposo Shopping, São Paulo, Brazil	Won vacant WBA Fedecaribe super middleweight title
21	Win	18–1–1 (1)	Gilberto Pereira dos Santos	UD	10	21 Aug 2021	Clube Mogiano, Mogi Mirim, Brazil	Won vacant WBC Latino super middleweight title
20	Win	17–1–1 (1)	Clebson Tubarão	TKO	1 (10), 1:24	24 Jul 2021	Ginásio do Coliseu Boxing Club, Guarulhos, Brazil	Won vacant Brazilian cruiserweight title
19	Draw	16–1–1 (1)	D'Mitrius Ballard	MD	10	5 Dec 2019	The Hangar, Costa Mesa, California, US	For vacant WBC–NABF middleweight title
18	Loss	16–1 (1)	Chris Pearson	UD	10	2 May 2019	Hard Rock Hotel and Casino, Las Vegas, Nevada, US	For vacant WBC Latino middleweight title
17	Win	16–0 (1)	Elias Espadas	UD	10	21 Jul 2018	Hard Rock Hotel and Casino, Las Vegas, Nevada, US	
16	Win	15–0 (1)	Richard Gutierrez	UD	8	31 Mar 2018	Marina Bay Sportsplex, Quincy, Massachusetts, US	
15	Win	14–0 (1)	Taronze Washington	TKO	4 (10), 3:00	12 Aug 2017	A La Carte Event Pavilion, Tampa, Florida, US	
14	Win	13–0 (1)	Morgan Fitch	UD	10	5 May 2017	Cosmopolitan of Las Vegas, Las Vegas, Nevada, US	
13	Win	12–0 (1)	Germán Pérez	TKO	1 (10), 0:27	17 Dec 2016	The Forum, Inglewood, California, US	
12	Win	11–0 (1)	Devis Cáceres	TKO	2 (10), 0:54	8 Jul 2016	Mendes Convention Center, Santos, Brazil	Retained WBC Latino middleweight title
11	Win	10–0 (1)	Jorge Caraballo	KO	2 (10), 2:10	4 Mar 2016	Mendes Convention Center, Santos, Brazil	Won WBC Latino middleweight title
10	Win	9–0 (1)	Francisco Cordero	RTD	8 (10), 3:00	14 Nov 2015	Ginásio Municipal Falcão, Praia Grande, Brazil	
9	Win	8–0 (1)	Alberto Gustavo Sanchez	UD	8	18 Sep 2015	Club Juventud Unida, Mina Clavero, Argentina	
8	Win	7–0 (1)	José Carlos Paz	UD	10	6 Jun 2015	Arena Santos, Santos, Brazil	
7	Win	6–0 (1)	Gerardo Ibarra	UD	8	30 Apr 2015	Fantasy Springs Resort Casino, Indio, California, US	
6	Win	5–0 (1)	Deartie Tucker	UD	6	2 Apr 2015	Belasco Theater, Los Angeles, California, US	
5	Win	4–0 (1)	Raymond Terry	KO	1 (6), 1:21	12 Mar 2015	Freeman Coliseum, San Antonio, Texas, US	
4	Win	3–0 (1)	Martin Fidel Ríos	UD	8	15 Nov 2014	Ginásio Municipal Falcão, Praia Grande, Brazil	
3	Win	2–0 (1)	Jesus Cruz	TKO	3 (6), 3:00	12 Jul 2014	MGM Grand, Las Vegas, Nevada, US	
2	Win	1–0 (1)	Francisco Najera	UD	4	26 Apr 2014	StubHub Center, Carson, California, US	
1	NC	0–0 (1)	Martin Fidel Ríos	NC	3 (4), 0:01	25 Jan 2014	Arena Santos, Santos, Brazil	
