= Alfonso Blanco =

Alfonso Blanco may refer to:

- Alfonso Blanco Antúnez (born 1987), Mexican footballer
- Alfonso Blanco (boxer) (born 1986), Venezuelan boxer
