= Maurice Weber =

German boxer

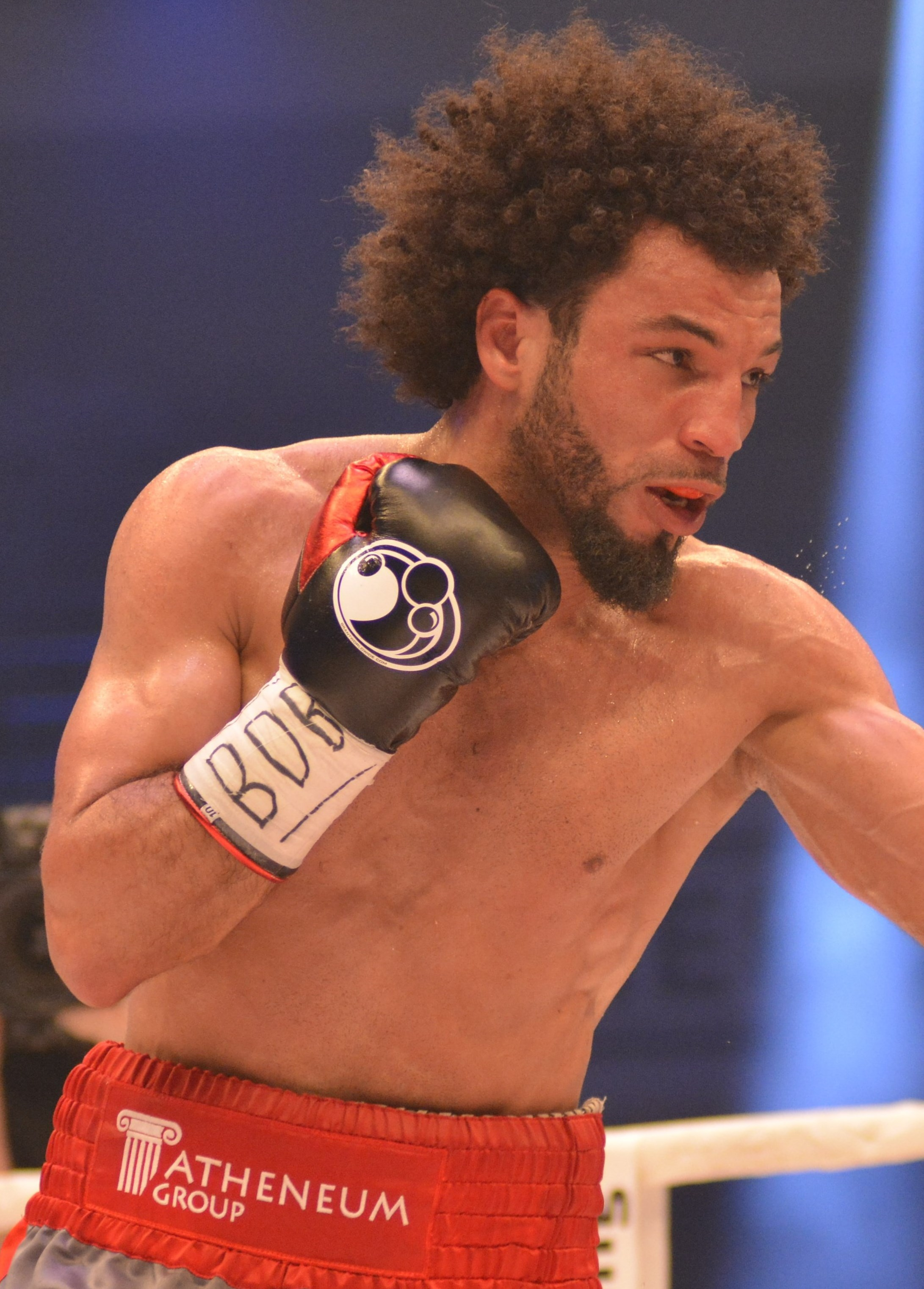

Personal information
- Nationality: German
- Born: Mohammed Lassoued; 28 June 1981 (age 45) Leverkusen, Germany
- Height: 178 cm (5 ft 10 in)
- Weight: super-welterweight

Boxing career
- Reach: 165 cm (65 in)
- Stance: Orthodox

Boxing record
- Total fights: 25
- Wins: 22
- Win by KO: 9
- Losses: 2
- Draws: 1

Maurice Weber (born Mohammed Lassoued, 28 June 1981) is a German retired professional boxer. He fought for the WBA interim super-welterweight title in 2015 against Jack Culcay.

== Professional career ==
Weber turned pro in 2005. He won his first 7 fights, before a draw with Frank Haroche. Weber was ranked as high as 6th on the WBA super-welterweight rankings. Weber challenged Jack Culcay for the WBA interim super-welterweight in May 2015 in Festhalle, Frankfurt. Weber lost by unanimous decision 118–110, 116–111, and 115-112 even though he knocked Culcay down in the third round.

=== Retirement ===
Weber fought one more time, picking up a KO victory in April, 2016, and then didn't fight again, retiring in 2019 due to persistent hand injuries.

== Professional boxing record ==
| 25 fights | 22 wins | 2 losses |
|---|---|---|
| By knockout | 9 | 0 |
| By decision | 13 | 2 |
| Draws | 1 | |

| No. | Result | Record | Opponent | Type | Round, time | Date | Location | Notes |
|---|---|---|---|---|---|---|---|---|
| 25 | Win | 22-2-1 | (Georgia (country)) Vladimer Karelidze | KO | 3 (8) | 9 Apr 2016 | MBS Arena, Potsdam, Germany | |
| 24 | Loss | 21–2-1 | (Germany) Jack Culcay | UD | 12 | 9 May 2015 | Festhalle, Frankfurt, Germany | For the WBA Interim World Super-Welterweight title |
| 23 | Win | 21–1-1 | (Georgia (country)) Gary Abajyan | UD | 8 | 8 Aug 2014 | Porsche Arena, Stuttgart, Germany | |
| 22 | Win | 20–1-1 | (Georgia (country)) Renat Samedov | TK) | 6 (10) | 31 May 2014 | König Palast, Krefeld, Germany | |
| 21 | Win | 19–1-1 | (Ukraine) Volodymyr Borovskyy | TKO | 2 (8) | 7 Dec 2013 | Porsche Arena, Stuttgart, Germany | |
| 20 | Win | 18–1-1 | (Belarus) Aliaksandr Abramenka | TKO | 1 (10) | 6 Jul 2013 | Westfalenhalle, Dortmund, Germany | |
| 19 | Win | 17–1-1 | (Poland) Mariusz Biskupski | UD | 6 | 1 Feb 2013 | ISS Dome, Düsseldorf, Germany | |
| 18 | Win | 16–1-1 | (Belarus) Andrei Dolgozhiev | TKO | 3 (6) | 1 Sept 2012 | König Pilsener Arena, Oberhausen, Germany | |
| 17 | Win | 15–1-1 | (Belarus) Aliaksei Volchan | UD | 6 | 8 Jun 2012 | Sarajevo, Bosnia and Herzegovina | |
| 16 | Win | 14–1-1 | (Belarus) Andrei Dolgozhiev | TKO | 2 (6) | 13 Apr 2012 | Lanxess-Arena, Cologne, Germany | |
| 15 | Win | 13–1-1 | (Germany) Alexander Riegel | UD | 6 | 2 Dec 2011 | SAP-Arena, Mannheim, Germany | |
| 14 | Loss | 13–1-1 | (France) Frederic Serre | MD | 8 | 5 Dec 2008 | Sporthalle Brandberge, Halle an der Saale, Germany | |
| 13 | Win | 12–0-1 | (Germany) Johannes Fabrizius | UD | 10 | 11 Jul 2008 | Rundturnhalle, Cuxhaven, Germany | |
| 12 | Win | 11–0-1 | (Germany) Daniel Kaefer | UD | 10 | 5 Apr 2008 | Burg-Wächter Castello, Düsseldorf, Germany | |
| 11 | Win | 10–0-1 | (Germany) Daniel Kaefer | UD | 8 | 13 Nov 2007 | Hohenstaufenhalle, Göppingen, Germany | |
| 10 | Win | 9–0-1 | (Austria) Gotthard Hinteregger | UD | 8 | 30 Jun 2007 | Porsche Arena, Stuttgart, Germany | |
| 9 | Win | 8–0-1 | (France) Gabriel Lecrosnier | UD | 6 | 27 Feb 2007 | Kugelbake-Halle, Cuxhaven, Germany | |
| 8 | Draw | 7–0-1 | (France) Frank Haroche | D | 6 | 18 Nov 2006 | Burg-Wächter Castello, Düsseldorf, Germany | |
| 7 | Win | 7–0 | (Estonia) Albert Starikov | UD | 6 | 10 Oct 2006 | T-Mobile Arena, Prague, Czech Republic | |
| 6 | Win | 6–0 | (Latvia) Deniss Aleksejevs | UD | 6 | 22 Aug 2006 | Universum Gym, Wandsbek, Germany | |
| 5 | Win | 5–0 | (Slovakia) Patrik Prokopecz | UD | 4 | 6 May 2006 | Burg-Wächter Castello, Düsseldorf, Germany | |
| 4 | Win | 4–0 | (Poland) Jan Salamacha | KO | 3 (4) | 25 Mar 2006 | TURM Erlebnis City, Oranienburg, Germany | |
| 3 | Win | 3–0 | (Czech Republic) Michal Ďurovič | UD | 4 | 4 Feb 2006 | Burg-Wächter Castello, Düsseldorf, Germany | |
| 2 | Win | 2–0 | (Germany) Max Steltzer | TKO | 4 (4) | 14 Jan 2006 | Balhaus Arena, Aschersleben, Germany | |
| 1 | Win | 1–0 | (Slovakia) Vladimír Tažík | TKO | 1 (4) | 26 Nov 2005 | Wilhelm-Dopatka-Halle, Leverkusen, Germany | |
