= Ezequiel Maderna =

Argentine boxer (born 1986)

Personal information
- Nickname: El Olímpico
- Born: Ezequiel Osvaldo Maderna; 1 October 1986 (age 40) La Plata, Buenos Aires, Argentina
- Height: 6 ft 2 in (188 cm)
- Weight: Light heavyweight

Boxing career
- Reach: 78 in (198 cm)
- Stance: Orthodox

Boxing record
- Total fights: 46
- Wins: 31
- Win by KO: 21
- Losses: 15

Ezequiel Osvaldo Maderna (born 1 October 1986) is an Argentine professional boxer. He is also a former Olympian for Argentina in the men's middleweight division.

== Amateur career ==
At the South American Games 2006 he won bronze when he lost 7:9 to Alfonso Blanco. At the second Olympic qualifier he beat three fighters including Clarence Joseph then lost to fellow-qualifier Shawn Estrada but got his ticket anyway. In Beijing he lost his rematch with Estrada in his first bout.

== Pro career ==
On 6 December 2008 Maderna won his pro debut against veteran Guillermo Pablo Armani.

== Professional boxing record ==
31 Wins (21 knockouts), 15 Losses
Res.	Record	Opponent	Type	Rd.,Time	Date	Location	Notes
Loss	31–15	(Poland) Adam Kownacki	RTD	5 (12)	2026-11-21	Hala Sportowa im. Olimpijczykow, Łomża, Poland	
Loss	31–14	(Turkey) Mehmet Nadir Ünal	TKO	3 (10)	2025-02-26	Montreal Casino, Montreal, Canada	
Loss	31–13	(Russia) Imam Khataev	TKO	7 (10)	2024-09-05	Montreal Casino, Montreal, Canada	For NABF light heavyweight title
Loss	31–12	(Russia) Vasily Voytsekhovsky	MD	10	2024-02-10	KRK Uralets, Yekaterinburg, Russia	
Win	31–11	(Russia) Timur Nikarkhoev	TKO	3 (10)	2023-09-09	BMW Park, Munich, Germany	
Win	30–11	(Argentina) Hector Carlos Santana	TKO	2 (4)	2023-08-25	Union de Padres Los Toritos, Buenos Aires, Argentina	
Loss	29–11	(England) Willy Hutchinson	KO	4 (10)	2023-05-12	York Hall, London, England	For WBC International light heavyweight title
Win	29–10	(United Kingdom) Karol Itauma	TKO	5 (10)	2023-01-28	(United Kingdom) Wembley Arena, London, England	Won vacant WBC International light-heavyweight title
Win	28–10	(Argentina) Maximiliano Agustin Corso	KO	5 (6)	2022-12-03	Gimnasio Municipal Mariano Freire, Buenos Aires, Argentina	
Loss	27–10	(Cuba) Osleys Iglesias	KO	1 (10)	2022-09-24	Hala Dworca Łódź Fabryczna, Łódź, Poland	
Loss	27–9	(Libya) Malik Zinad	UD	10	2022-06-26	Hall des Sports ULB Erasme, Brussels, Belgium	
Loss	27–8	(Poland) Paweł Stępień	MD	8	2022-03-26	Opera i Filharmonia Podlaska, Białystok, Poland	
Loss	27–7	(Argentina) Abraham Gabriel Buonarrigo	TKO	4 (10)	2021-12-10	Estadio F.A.B., Buenos Aires, Argentina	For vacant South American super middleweight title
Win	27–6	(Argentina) Martin Javier Molina	TKO	6 (6)	2021-08-13	Microestadio Municipal de Pilar, Buenos Aires, Argentina	
Loss	26–6	(Russia) Fedor Chudinov	KO	10 (12)	2019-07-22	Red Square, Moscow, Russia	For WBA Continental super middleweight title
Loss	26–5	(Venezuela) Jose Uzcategui	UD	10	2018-09-28	(United States) Oracle Arena, Oakland, California, US	
Win	26–4	(Argentina) Martin Fidel Rios	UD	10	2018-01-27	Club Once Unidos, Mar del Plata, Argentina	Won Argentina (FAB) super middleweight title
Win	25–4	(Argentina) Jorge Daniel Caraballo	UD	6	2017-06-10	GAP Disco, Mar del Plata, Argentina	
Loss	24–4	(Argentina) Martin Fidel Rios	SD	10	2017-02-04	Microestadio Municipal, Hurlingham, Argentina	For vacant Argentina (FAB) super middleweight title
Win	24–3	(Argentina) Walter Gabriel Sequeira	KO	6 (10)	2016-09-17	Gimnasio de la Escuela San Luis Gonzaga, Jauregui, Buenos Aires, Argentina	
Loss	23–3	(Russia) Artur Beterbiyev	KO	4 (10)	2016-06-04	Centre Bell, Montreal, Quebec, Canada	
Win	23–2	(Argentina) Rolando Wenceslao Mansilla	TKO	1 (10)	2015-05-22	Centro Recreativo Municipal Néstor Carlos Kirchner, Buenos Aires, Argentina	
Win	22–2	(Argentina) Jose Alberto Clavero	UD	10 (10)	2014-10-10	Estadio F.A.B., Buenos Aires, Argentina	
Win	21–2	(Uruguay) Richard Vidal	TKO	3 (10)	2014-04-25	Club de Gimnasia y Esgrima La Plata, La Plata, Argentina	Won vacant WBC Latino super middleweight title
Loss	20–2	(South Africa) Thomas Oosthuizen	MD	12 (12)	2013-11-09	Emperors Palace, Kempton Park, Gauteng, South Africa	For IBO super middleweight title
Win	20–1	(Argentina) Arnaldo Alcides Benitez	UD	10 (10)	2013-09-06	Centro Recreativo Municipal Néstor Carlos Kirchner, Buenos Aires, Argentina	
Loss	19–1	(Dominican Republic) Edwin Rodriguez	UD	10 (10)	2013-03-30	Salle des Etoiles, Monte-Carlo, Monaco	
Win	19–0	(Argentina) Claudio Ariel Ábalos	RTD	7 (10)	2012-12-14	Estadio Boxing Club, Río Gallegos, Argentina	Retained FAB super middleweight title
Win	18–0	(Argentina) Oscar Daniel Véliz	UD	10 (10)	2012-8-25	Club Banco Provincia, City Bell, Argentina	
Win	17–0	(Argentina) Ruben Eduardo Acosta	UD	12 (12)	2012-5-26	Club Platense, La Plata, Argentina	Retained interim WBO Latino super middleweight title
Win	16–0	(Argentina) Dario German Balmaceda	TKO	1 (10)	2011-11-5	Club Banco Provincia, City Bell, Argentina	Retained Argentina (FAB) super middleweight title
Win	15–0	(Uruguay) Jorge Rodríguez Olivera	TKO	3 (12)	2011-8-27	Club Banco Provincia, City Bell, Argentina	Retained Argentina (FAB) super middleweight title
Win	14–0	(Argentina) Martín Abel Bruer	TKO	1 (10)	2011-5-28	Club Banco Provincia, City Bell, Argentina	Won interim WBO Latino super middleweight title
Win	13–0	(Argentina) Ruben Eduardo Acosta	UD	10 (10)	2011-3-5	Club Platense, La Plata, Argentina	Won Argentina (FAB) super middleweight title
Win	12–0	(Paraguay) Richard Emanuel Moray Martinez	TKO	2 (6)	2010-12-3	Parque Municipal Eva Perón, Lomas de Zamora, Argentina	
Win	11–0	(Argentina) Ricardo Manuel Genero	KO	5 (8)	2010-9-17	Dolores, Buenos Aires, Argentina	
Win	10–0	(Argentina) Lucas Damián Molina	RTD	3 (6)	2010-4-17	Casino City Center, Rosario, Santa Fe, Argentina	
Win	9–0	(Argentina) Victor Hugo Peralta	KO	3 (6)	2010-2-13	Centro de Fomento Alumni, Los Hornos, Argentina	
Win	8–0	(Argentina) Osvaldo Antonio Díaz	KO	2 (6)	2009-12-18	Club Circunvalación, La Plata, Argentina	
Win	7–0	(Argentina) Crispulo Javier Andino	KO	1 (6)	2009-11-7	Estadio Cubierto Municipal, Dean Funes, Córdoba, Argentina	
Win	6–0	(Argentina) Ramón Argentino Guidetti	TKO	4 (6)	2009-9-19	Club Independiente, Castelli, Argentina	
Win	5–0	(Argentina) José Eduardo Martínez	KO	2 (6)	2009-8-29	Asociación Mutual Club El Tala, San Francisco, Córdoba, Argentina	
Win	4–0	(Argentina) Ramón Argentino Guidetti	UD	4 (4)	2009-6-12	Sociedad de Fomento Julio Argentino Roca, Moreno, Buenos Aires, Argentina	
Win	3–0	(Argentina) Gabriel Arturo Ramírez	KO	2 (4)	2009-4-25	Gimnasio Municipal, Cutral Có, Neuquén, Argentina	
Win	2–0	(Argentina) Victor Hugo Peralta	UD	4 (4)	2008-12-27	Club Argentino, Marcos Juárez, Cordoba, Argentina	
Win	1–0	(Argentina) Guillermo Pablo Armani	UD	4 (4)	2008-12-6	Club Social y Deportivo San Vicente, Bell Ville, Cordoba, Argentina	
