= Xixová-Japuí State Park =

State park in São Paulo, Brazil

- Parque Estadual Xixová-Japuí
- IUCN category II (national park)
- View from the sea

- Location within Brazil
- Nearest city: Praia Grande, São Paulo
- Coordinates: 24.006111°S 46.391389°W
- Area: 901 hectares (2,230 acres)
- Designation: State park
- Created: 27 September 1993
- Administrator: Instituto Florestal SP

The Xixová-Japuí State Park (Portuguese: Parque Estadual Xixová-Japuí) is a State park in the state of São Paulo, Brazil. It protects an isolated area of well-preserved Atlantic Forest on the Atlantic coast near the city of São Paulo.

== Location ==
The Xixová-Japuí State Park has an area of 901 hectares (2,230 acres). It is divided between the municipalities of Praia Grande with 554 hectares (1,370 acres), and São Vicente with 347 hectares (860 acres). Of this, 600 hectares (1,500 acres) is land and 301 hectares (740 acres) is marine. The park is on the sea shore, isolated from the Serra do Mar, and protects biodiversity in an area that is heavily affected by housing, industry and port activities.

== History ==
The first European settlement in the area was in 1510. The town of São Vicente, just north of the park, was officially founded on 22 January 1532, the first Vila in Brazil. The region was mainly agricultural with a small population until the middle of the 19th century. The port of Santos, beside São Vicente, began to expand from 1845 with the growth of the coffee trade. Banana plantations and other fruit orchards were established, and a tannery exploiting tannin from the mangroves. In 1902 construction of the Fortaleza de Itaipu was launched in the south of the park area.

During the 20th century the population of the Santos region increased greatly due to the port and industrial development, but the Japuí area holding the park was not occupied apart from a real estate development called "Parque Prainha" launched in 1928. From the 1950s the beach community of Praia Grande to the west of the park started to be developed in an uncontrolled manner. The tannery was closed in the 1970s, and infrastructure such as electricity, water, sewage and paved roads were gradually introduced in the communities round the park area.

The Xixová-Japuí State Park was created by the state governor Luís Antônio Fleury Filho by decree 37.536 of 27 September 1993 with the goal of providing complete protection of the remaining ecosystems it contained.

== Environment ==
The park protects one of the best preserved fragments of Atlantic Forest in Baixada Santista. The vegetation is dense submontane and lowland rainforest, beach vegetation, restinga, and vegetation associated with the rocky shores. The rainforest is well-preserved, in an advanced stage of succession, with some evidence of selective logging in the past. The forest includes 334.70 hectares (827.1 acres) of dense submontane rainforest and 190.39 hectares (470.5 acres) of lowland rainforest.

A 2014 survey of flora found 13 pteridophyte and 312 spermatophyte species in 85 families and 220 genera, including 112 species of trees. Threatened species were Euterpe edulis, Tabebuia cassinoides, Protium kleinii, Swartzia flaemingii, Lobelia anceps, Ocotea odorifera, Hibiscus bifurcatus, Brosimum glaziovii and Pharus latifolius. The survey reported Erythroxylum catharinense Amaral and Beilschmiedia fluminensis Kosterm for the first time for São Paulo State. A total of 457 plant species have been identified, comprising 106 families and 294 genera. Of these 13 species are threatened with extinction.

319 species of vertebrate have been identified, including 13 terrestrial mammals, 21 marine mammals, 87 birds, 21 amphibians, 35 terrestrial reptiles, 5 marine reptiles and 137 fish. There are records of 68 taxa of zooplankton, in addition to phytoplankton, consolidated and non-consolidated benthos.

== Human impact ==
There are three beaches, and trails used by surfers. Traces of past occupation are the old tannery and a quarry. The park is monitored systematically for environmental problems. Visitors should be accompanied by monitors and employees of the protection and maintenance program, but this is not always the case. The park is often used by researchers. Threats come from the population living within the park, hunting, illegal extraction of forest products, fishing, incursions by domestic animals, release of exotic animals, military activities in the area of the park that overlaps with the Itaipu fortress, and indigenous people occupying the Paranapuã beach from 2004.

== Sources ==
- Leonel, Cristiane (April 2010), Plano de Manejo do Parque Estadual Xixová-Japuí (PDF) (in Portuguese), Fundação Florestal do Estado de São Paulo, archived from the original (PDF) on 2016-11-28
- Moura, Claudio de; Pastore, João Aurélio; Franco, Geraldo Antônio Daher Corrêa (December 2007), "Flora Vascular do Parque Estadual Xixová-Japuí Setor Paranapuã, São Vicente, Baixada Santista, SP", Rev. Inst. Flor. (in Portuguese), 19 (2), São Paulo
- PES Xixová-Japuí (in Portuguese), ISA: Instituto Socioambiental
