= Jean-Mickaël Raymond =

French boxer (born 1986)

Jean-Mickaël Raymond (born 29 August 1986) is a French amateur boxer. He qualified for the 2008 Summer Olympics as a middleweight.

In addition to Greece's Georgios Gazis, Raymond defeated three unknowns. He was then stopped in the final by Darren Sutherland.

At the Olympics, Raymond lost his first bout 2:8 to Asian champion, Elshod Rasulov.
