= Darren Sutherland =

Irish boxer

Personal information
- Nickname: The Dazzler
- Nationality: Irish
- Born: Darren John Sutherland; 18 April 1982 Dublin, Ireland
- Died: 14 September 2009 (aged 27) Bromley, London, England
- Height: 5 ft 9 in (175 cm)
- Weight: Super-middleweight

Boxing career
- Stance: Orthodox

Boxing record
- Total fights: 4
- Wins: 4
- Win by KO: 4
- Losses: 0
Medal record
Men's amateur boxing
Representing Ireland
Olympic Games
| Bronze medal – third place | 2008 Beijing | Middleweight |
European Union Championships
| Gold medal – first place | 2007 Dublin | Middleweight |
| Gold medal – first place | 2008 Cetniewo | Middleweight |
Irish National Championships
| Bronze medal – third place | 2002 Dublin | Light-middleweight |
| Gold medal – first place | 2006 Dublin | Middleweight |
| Gold medal – first place | 2007 Dublin | Middleweight |
| Gold medal – first place | 2008 Dublin | Middleweight |

Darren John Sutherland (18 April 1982 – 14 September 2009) was an Irish professional boxer from Mulhuddart, Dublin. His amateur career was crowned by a 2008 Olympic bronze medal.

== Early life ==
Sutherland was born in Dublin to Linda from Finglas and Anthony Sutherland from Saint Vincent in the West Indies. The family lived in London until Darren was seven and then in Saint Vincent for four years, before returning to Dublin and latterly Navan, County Meath.

== Amateur career ==
Sutherland represented the St Saviour's ABC in Dublin and won the Leinster senior title in 2005, 2006 and 2007. He faced Edward Healy in the 2006 and 2007 Final and Darren O'Neill in 2008 winning all three. Sutherland's international career featured a great rivalry with Britain's James DeGale, who later paid tribute to Sutherland upon winning his first professional world title in 2015.

=== 2007 EU Amateur Championships ===
At the 2007 EU Amateur Championships in Dublin, Sutherland won gold at middleweight. Results were:

- (Spain) Mario Duro: Won - RSC (Round 3)
- (Italy) Ivano Del Monte: Won - PTS (32:19)
- (United Kingdom) James DeGale: Won - PTS (23:19)

=== 2008 EU Amateur Championships ===
At the 2008 EU Amateur Championships in Cetniewo, Sutherland won gold at middleweight. Results were:

- (France) Samy Anouche: Won - PTS (28:12)
- (Germany) Stefan Härtel: Won - PTS (20:9)
- (United Kingdom) James DeGale: Won - PTS (22:16)

=== 2008 Olympic Games ===
At the 2008 Olympic Games in Beijing, Sutherland won bronze at middleweight. Results were:

- First round bye: Advanced
- (Algeria) Nabil Kassel: Won - RSC (Round 4)
- (Venezuela) Alfonso Blanco: Won - PTS (11–1)
- (United Kingdom) James DeGale: Lost - PTS (3–10)

== Professional career ==
Following the exposure gained at the Olympics, Sutherland was offered a number of contracts as a professional boxer. In October 2008 he signed terms with London-based promoter Frank Maloney. On 18 December 2008, Sutherland made a winning start to his professional career with a first-round knockout of Georgi Iliev in Dublin. After the bout, Sutherland's promoter Frank Maloney said "I think we've found a real superstar here tonight and this is just the start of a long journey". His next fight, against Siarhei Navarka on 6 March at Robin Park Arena in Wigan, ended with Sutherland winning by a third round stoppage.

Sutherland won his third fight at the Fenton Manor Sports Complex in Stoke-on-Trent on 29 May against Vepkhia Tchilaia. Sutherland won his next fight against Gennadiy Rasalev in York Hall, London.

== Death ==
On 14 September 2009, Sutherland was found dead with his wrists bound at his apartment in Bromley by his promoter, Frank Maloney. It was alleged he died by hanging himself. He was depressed. Olympic gold medallist, James DeGale commented on the death: "It is very, very sad news - I just can't believe it, It is a tragedy. First and foremost, my heart goes out to his family. I just could not believe it; my heart went to the floor when I heard. He was a big part of my Olympic medal journey and it is just terrible. I just do not know what to say except that he was a brilliant fighter, in fact an excellent fighter, and he was a gentleman outside the ring as well. He had an Olympic bronze medal and his whole life to look forward to. He had a great future, and my heart goes out to everyone who knew him."

His corpse was exhumed in September 2010 for a private postmortem at his family's request. An open verdict was delivered at the inquest in March 2012.

Following Sutherland's death, DeGale kept the initials "DS" on his shorts in professional bouts. When he won the IBF super middleweight world title against Andre Dirrell in 2015, he spoke post-fight of his relationship with Sutherland and dedicated the victory to him. "It's for Darren Sutherland as well, of course. My late rival" he said. "When he took his life back in 2009 it was horrendous. From when he passed, I've always had 'DS' on my shorts. And this world title is for him as well. A great guy. A great fighter. Unbelievable fighter. We've had some great, great scraps. It's for him."

== Professional boxing record ==
| 4 fights | 4 wins | 0 losses |
|---|---|---|
| By knockout | 4 | 0 |
| By decision | 0 | 0 |

| No. | Result | Record | Opponent | Type | Round, time | Date | Location | Notes |
|---|---|---|---|---|---|---|---|---|
| 4 | Win | 4–0 | Gennadiy Rasalev | TKO | 4 (6), 1:16 | 30 Jun 2009 | York Hall, London, England | |
| 3 | Win | 3–0 | Vepkhia Tchilaia | TKO | 4 (6), 1:24 | 29 May 2009 | Fenton Manor Sports Complex, Stoke-on-Trent, England | |
| 2 | Win | 2–0 | Siarhei Navarka | TKO | 3 (6), 0:26 | 6 Mar 2009 | Robin Park Centre, Wigan, England | |
| 1 | Win | 1–0 | Georgi Iliev | TKO | 1 (6), 2:42 | 18 Dec 2008 | Dublin City University, Dublin, Ireland | |
