= Said Rachidi =

Moroccan boxer

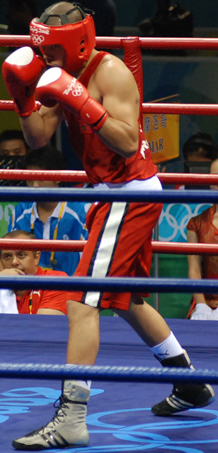
Said Rachidi at the 2008 Summer Olympics

Said Rachidi (born July 14, 1986) is a boxer from Morocco best known for competing at the 2008 Olympics as middleweight.

== Career ==
At the Arab Championships Rachidi was edged out by Wahid Abderredha of Iraq, and he did not compete at all in the All-African Games, despite qualifying. He was successful at the 2007 World Amateur Boxing Championships in Chicago, though, where he reached the quarterfinal to qualify for the Olympics. He lost to Bakhtiyar Artayev. At the Pan-Arab Games he defeated Abdelhafid Benchebla but was edged out in the final by Mohammed Hikal. At the 2008 Olympics he lost again to Artayev.
