= Herry Saliku Biembe =

Congolese boxer (born 1981)

Personal information
- Full name: Herry Saliku Biembe Marco
- Nationality: Democratic Republic of the Congo
- Born: May 14, 1981 (age 45) Kinshasa
- Height: 1.82 m (6 ft 0 in)
- Weight: 75 kg (165 lb)

Sport
- Sport: Boxing
- Weight class: Middleweight
- Club: Club Lausannois de Boxe

Herry Saliku Biembe (born 14 May 1981) is a boxer from Democratic Republic of the Congo who qualified for the 2008 Olympics at middleweight.

At the 2nd AIBA African 2008 Olympic Qualifying Tournament the previously unknown Biembe won second place, even though he was shut out in the final by Badou Jack of Gambia.

In the Olympics, he lost his opening bout to Georgios Gazis of Greece and was eliminated.
