= Shawn Estrada =

American boxer

Personal information
- Nickname: El Chamuko The Monster
- Nationality: American
- Born: April 1, 1985 (age 41) East Los Angeles, CA
- Height: 6 ft 1 in (185 cm)
- Weight: Super Middleweight

Boxing career
- Reach: 77 in (196 cm)
- Stance: Orthodox

Boxing record
- Total fights: 16
- Wins: 16
- Win by KO: 14
- Losses: 0
- Draws: 0
- No contests: 0

Shawn Estrada (born April 1, 1985) is an undefeated Mexican American professional boxer in the Super Middleweight division and was a U.S. Olympian at the 2008 Summer Olympics. Estrada ran for the city council in Commerce, California.

== Early life ==
Raised in East Los Angeles, Estrada is the son of former 1968 Mexican Olympic team boxer Juan Estrada and the youngest of 16 siblings. He credits the sport of boxing as the force that kept him out of gangs growing up.

His father had hoped to travel to the Beijing Olympics, but his failing health kept him home in Maywood. On August 17, 2008, his father died at St. Vincent Medical Center in Los Angeles.

== Amateur career ==
Estrada had an outstanding amateur record of 110-7. He won the 2000 Junior Olympic Championship at age 14 and the 2001 Pan-American Games Gold Medal, beating the top Cuban and Puerto Rican boxers in his weight class and age bracket. However, Estrada’s junior amateur career ended abruptly after his brother was killed in a gang-related shooting.

In 2007, he lost to Shawn Porter but won the Olympic qualification beating highly touted Danny Jacobs twice. He lost at the first American Olympic qualifier 3:13 to Carlos Góngora but won three bouts at the second qualifier.

At the World Championships 2007 he defeated Israel's Artur Zlatopolski and then Japan's Ryota Murata, but was upset by Konstantin Buga of Germany 11-11.

=== Olympic results ===
At the 2008 Olympics Estrada won against Argentina's Ezequiel Maderna but lost to the eventual gold medalist England's James DeGale 5-11 in his second bout.

== Professional career ==
On November 29, 2008 Shawn made his Pro debut with a first round K.O. of veteran boxer Lawrence Jones. He's had layoffs because of back injuries and then had to undergo surgery for a ruptured tendon in his hand. He is also a member of Team Fight to Walk, which supports America's first clinical stem cell trial, along with other notable fighters such as Boyd Melson, Demetrius Andrade, Steve Cunningham and Deandre Latimore.

=== Professional record ===
14 Wins (12 knockouts), 0 Losses, 0 Draw
Res.	Record	Opponent	Type	Rd., Time	Date	Location	Notes
Win	14-0-0	(United States) Terrance Woods	UD	8 (8)	February 17, 2012	(United States) College Park Center, Arlington, Texas	
Win	13-0-0	(Mexico) Alvaro Enriquez	TKO	3 (8), 0:22	August 13, 2011	Convention Center, Acapulco, Guerrero, Mexico	
Win	12-0-0	(United States) Byron Tyson	KO	1 (6), (1:27)	May 15, 2011	(United States) Home Depot Center, Carson, California	
Win	11-0-0	(United States) Jon Schmidt	KO	1 (6), (1:48)	January 28, 2011	(United States) Pechanga Resort & Casino, Temecula, California	
Win	10-0-0	(United States) Tony Hirsch	UD	6 (6)	November 8, 2010	(United States) Corrosion Hangar, Camp Lejuene, North Carolina	
Win	9-0-0	(United States) Nathan Bedwell	TKO	1 (4), (0:28)	October 7, 2010	(United States) Tachi Palace Hotel & Casino, Lemoore, California	
Win	8-0-0	(United States) Alex Armenta	TKO	1 (4), (0:57)	August 13, 2010	(United States) Citizens Business Bank Arena, Ontario, California	
Win	7-0-0	(United States) Eddie Hunter	KO	1 (4), (0:53)	July 23, 2010	(United States) Tachi Palace Hotel & Casino, Lemoore, California	
Win	6-0-0	(United States) Cory Jones	TKO	1 (4), (1:31)	May 16, 2009	(United States) Oracle Arena, Oakland, California	
Win	5-0-0	(United States) Nick Runningbear	TKO	1 (4), (3:00)	April 23, 2009	(United States) Tachi Palace Hotel & Casino, Lemoore, California	
Win	4-0-0	(United States) Omar Coffi	TKO	3 (4), (0:47)	April 11, 2009	(United States) Mandalay Bay Resort & Casino, Las Vegas, Nevada	
Win	3-0-0	(United States) Ray Craig	TKO	1 (4), (1:41)	March 27, 2009	(United States) Nokia Theater, Los Angeles, California	
Win	2-0-0	(United States) Shaun Spaid	TKO	1 (4), (0:43)	December 13, 2008	(United States) Morongo Casino, Resort & Spa, Cabazon, California	
Win	1-0-0	(United States) Lawrence Jones	KO	1 (4), (1:00)	November 29, 2008	(United States) Citizens Business Bank Arena, Ontario, California	
