= Konstantin Buga =

German boxer

Konstantin Buga (born 17 June 1985 in Atbasar, Kazakh Soviet Socialist Republic) is a German amateur boxer best known for qualifying for the 2008 Olympics as a middleweight.

== Career ==
Buga came to Germany in 1996 and received a German passport in 2002. He won the German championships at welterweight in 2005 but moved up to middleweight later.

He participated in the 2007 World Amateur Boxing Championships and was one of only two German quarterfinalists that qualified directly for the Olympics.

He upset local hero Shawn Estrada but lost to the surprise runner-up Alfonso Blanco of Venezuela.

=== World amateur championships results ===
- Defeated Tobias Webb (Wales) RSCO 3
- Defeated Jean-Mickaël Raymond (France) 19-8
- Defeated Shawn Estrada (United States) 11-11
- Lost to Alfonso Blanco (Venezuela) 9-18

=== Olympic games results ===
- Lost to Carlos Góngora (Ecuador) 7-14
