= Georgios Gazis =

Greek boxer (born 1981)

Personal information
- Full name: Γεώργιος Γαζής
- Nationality: Greece
- Born: 25 May 1981 (age 45) Kozani, Dytiki Makedonia
- Height: 1.85 m (6 ft 1 in)
- Weight: 75 kg (165 lb)

Sport
- Sport: Boxing
- Weight class: Middleweight
- Club: Ethnikos Kozani
Medal record
Mediterranean Games
Bronze medal – third place	2001 Tunis	Light Middleweight

Georgios Gazis (born 25 May 1981) is a Greek amateur boxer. He competed at the 2008 Summer Olympics in the men's middleweight division.

Gazis lost his qualifier semi to Jean-Mickaël Raymond but won the decisive third place bout against Victor Cotiujanschi.

At the Olympics, he defeated Herry Saliku Biembe but lost to southpaw Carlos Góngora (1:12).
