= Alfonso Blanco (boxer) =

Venezuelan boxer (born 1986)

Personal information
- Born: Alfonso Blanco Parra; 2 February 1986 (age 40) Caracas, Venezuela
- Height: 1.85 m (6 ft 1 in)
- Weight: Middleweight

Boxing career
- Reach: 189 cm (74 in)
- Stance: Orthodox

Boxing record
- Total fights: 17
- Wins: 16
- Win by KO: 8
- Losses: 1
- Draws: 0
- No contests: 0
Medal record
Boxing World Cup
Silver medal – second place	Moscow 2008	Middleweight
World Amateur Championships
Silver medal – second place	2007 Chicago	Middleweight
Bronze medal – third place	2009 Milan	Middleweight
South American Games
Gold medal – first place	2006 Buenos Aires	Middleweight
Gold medal – first place	2010 Medellín	Middleweight
Central American and Caribbean Games
Bronze medal – third place	2026 Santo Domingo	Heavyweight

Alfonso Blanco Parra (born 2 February 1986) is a Venezuelan professional boxer. As an amateur, he competed at the 2008 Summer Olympics and won the middleweight silver medal at the 2007 World Championships.

== Amateur career ==
Blanco won the 2006 South America title against Carlos Góngora. At the 2007 Pan American Games he exited early against the same opponent.

At the world championships Blanco beat Ireland's Darren Sutherland, Germany's Konstantin Buga and Olympic gold medalist Bakhtiyar Artayev to reach the finals at middleweight where he was defeated by Russian defending champion Matvey Korobov PTS 4:29.

His record as of 2007 is 118:16.

=== World Championships results ===
- Defeated James DeGale (Great Britain) 28-13
- Defeated Vijender Singh (India) 13-8
- Defeated Darren Sutherland (Ireland) 20-13
- Defeated Konstantin Buga (Germany) 18-9
- Defeated Bakhtiyar Artayev (Kazakhstan) 15-7
- Lost to Matvey Korobov (Russia) 4-29

=== Olympic Games results ===
2008 (as a middleweight)

- Defeated Argenis Casimiro Núñez (Dominican Republic) 18-7
- Lost to Darren Sutherland (Ireland) 1-11

== Professional career ==
He is signed to Oscar De La Hoya's Golden Boy Promotions.

== Professional boxing record ==
17 fights	16 wins	1 loss
By knockout	8	1
By decision	8	0

No.	Result	Record	Opponent	Type	Round, time	Date	Location	Notes
13	Loss	12–1	(Cameroon) Hassan N'Dam N'Jikam	KO	1 (12)	2016-12-17	Saint-Denis, Réunion, France	Lost Interim WBA middleweight title
12	Win	12–0	(Belarus) Sergey Khomitsky	UD	12 (12)	2015-10-10	El Poliedro, Caracas, Venezuela	Won Interim WBA middleweight title
11	Win	11-0	(Mexico) Alvaro Robles	UD	12 (12)	2015-06-27	La Guaira, Vargas, Venezuela	Won vacant WBA Fedecaribe and vacant WBC International Silver super welterweight titles
10	Win	10-0	(Venezuela) Edwin Mota	TKO	3 (10)	2015-03-07	Turmero, Aragua, Venezuela	
9	Win	9-0	(Colombia) Edison Garcia	TKO	2 (6)	2015-01-16	La Guaira, Vargas, Venezuela	
8	Win	8-0	(United States) Eddie Cordova	TKO	5 (6)	2012-03-17	(United States) Indio, California, U.S.	
7	Win	7-0	(United States) Leshon Sims	UD	6 (6)	2011-10-27	(United States) Los Angeles, California, U.S.	
6	Win	6-0	(United States) Cleveland Ishe	UD	6 (6)	2011-07-08	(United States) Primm, Nevada, U.S.	
5	Win	5-0	(Mexico) Juan Carlos Diaz	UD	4 (4)	2011-04-28	(United States) Los Angeles, California, U.S.	
4	Win	4-0	(United States) Ricardo Malfavon	UD	4 (4)	2011-04-01	(United States) Indio, California, U.S.	
3	Win	3–0	(Puerto Rico) Pablo Ruiz	KO	1 (4)	2011-03-05	(United States) Anaheim, California, U.S.	
2	Win	2–0	(United States) Gustavo Medina	TKO	3 (4)	2010-12-11	(United States) Las Vegas, Nevada, U.S.	
1	Win	1–0	(United States) Alfredo Riveira	UD	4 (4)	2010-09-17	(United States) Los Angeles, California, U.S.	

Preceded by Chris Eubank Jr. Stripped	WBA Middleweight Champion; Interim title October 25, 2015 – December 17, 2016	Succeeded by Hassan N'Dam N'Jikam
