= Praia Grande =

Municipality in São Paulo, Brazil

Município da Estância Balneária de Praia Grande
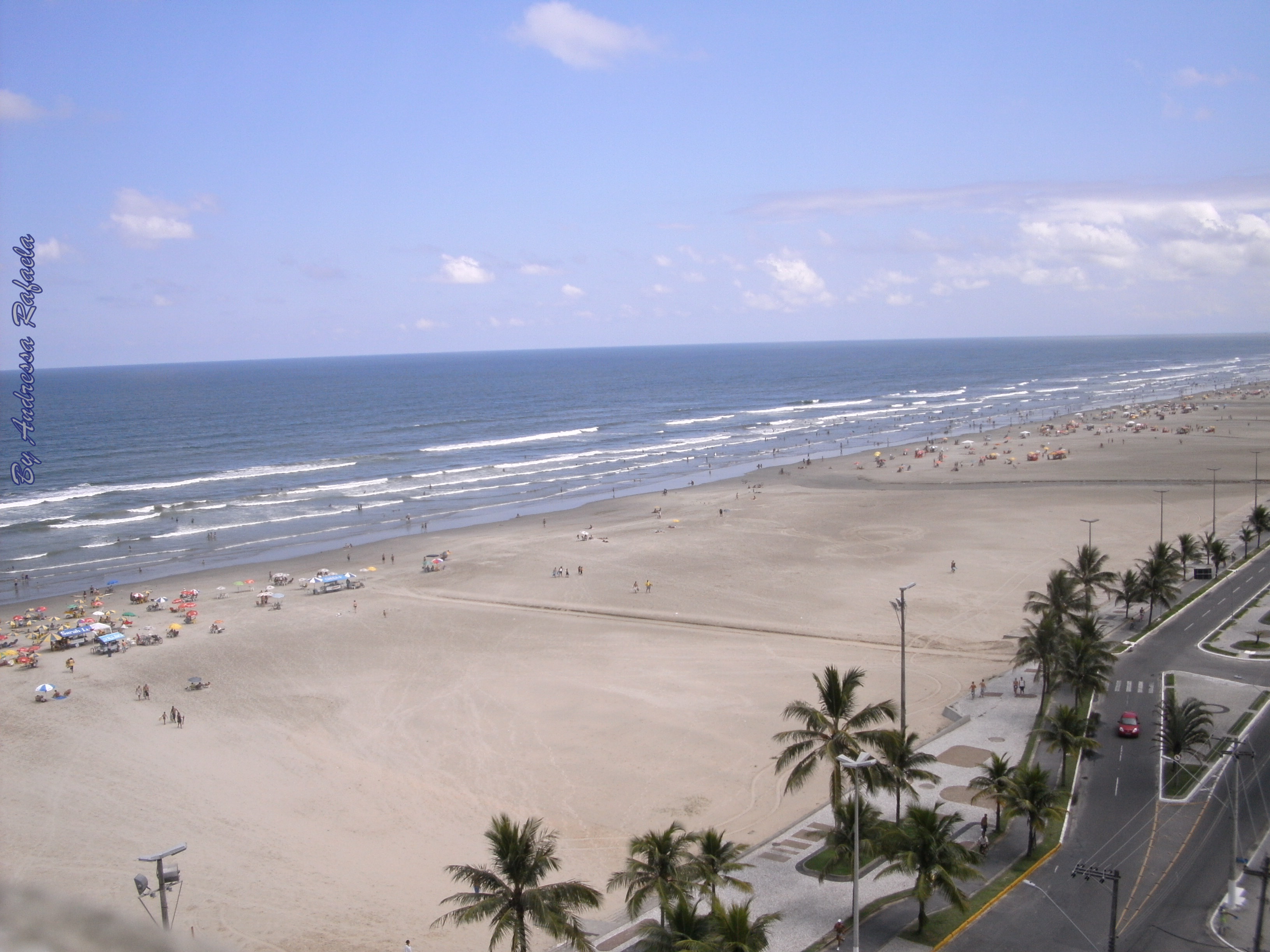
- View of Praia Grande city, São Paulo, Brazil.

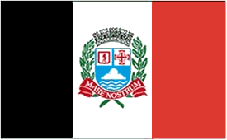
- Flag Coat of arms
- Nickname: " Cidade de Todos "
- Motto: Mare Nostrum "Our sea"
- Location of Praia Grande
- Coordinates: 24°00′22″S 46°24′10″W
- Country: Brazil
- Region: Southeast
- State: São Paulo

Government
  - Mayor: Alberto Pereira Mourão (PSDB)

Area
  - Total: 149.25 km^{2} (57.63 sq mi)
- Elevation: 3 m (9.8 ft)

Population (2025)
  - Total: 367,400
  - Density: 1,781/km^{2} (4,610/sq mi)
- Time zone: UTC-3 (BRT)
  - Summer (DST): UTC-2 (BRST)
- Postal Code: 11700-000
- Area code: +55 13
- HDI (2016): 0.785 – high
- Website: Praia Grande

Praia Grande is a municipality in the Baixada Santista Metropolitan Region, on the southern coast of the Brazilian state of São Paulo. It is part of the Immediate Region of Santos and its population measured in the IBGE census review in 2010 was 262,051 inhabitants. In the 2022 IBGE census, the population of Praia Grande was 349,935 inhabitants, being the city in Baixada Santista that grew the most in the period 2010–2022. It is the second most populous city on the coast of São Paulo, after only Santos. With an area of 149.652 km^{2}, the population density in 2022 was 2,338.32 inhabitants/km^{2}. The municipality is formed by the headquarters and the district of Solemar.

== History ==
Although the political emancipation is recent, the area covered today by the municipality of Praia Grande was one of the first areas colonized by the Portuguese, which began with the arrival of Martim Afonso in 1532. The first village founded by the explorer, sent by the Portuguese crown, was that of St. Vincent, which remained part Praia Grande until 18 January 1967.

After its emancipation on 19 January 1967, the city slightly accelerated the pace of growth experienced since the 1950s, earning a higher quality in their public services, given the proximity of the municipal government with the reality of the local population. In the 1980s, the city gained new impetus to its growth with the opening of the Small Sea Bridge - Deputy Esmeraldo Soares Tarquínio de Campos Filho Bridge (in the final stretch of the Rodovia dos Imigrantes), linking the island of São Vicente in the city, and solving two problems at once: as well as relieve traffic on saturated Suspension Bridge, the city gained a direct link to the capital without the need of going through the cities of Santos and São Vicente, in order to access the Via Anchieta, then the only option to reach the capital. Thus, Praia Grande became the resort closest to the capital.

However, this ease of access has brought great inconvenience, that they would be solved by 1993 when the city started a revolution: the transport system has been completely refurbished, more than 90% of the streets were paved, the sewage began an expansion of collection (which began with 60% of households by 2012 and reach 100%), being treated and thrown more than 3 km from the coast, the edge of the beach and the main tourist spots were completely re-urbanized, it was forbidden to input bus tours without prior authorization from the municipality, the road system has been completely revised and reconfigured on interventions that occurred until 2006.

Some projects are still to be deployed in the city, regardless of the administration, such as airport charges in the region of Andaraguá, State college campuses (UNESP) and Federal (UNIFESP), the transformation of municipal landfill in ecological park (awaiting decontamination of the soil) and Route 700, linking the Anhanguera to the Rodovia dos Imigrantes.

== Demographics ==
=== Population history ===
Year	Population
2003	215,474
2004	229,542
2009	249,551
2010	260,769
2012	272,390
2013	288,401
2014	293,695
2015	299,261
2020	330,845

Until the early 1990s, most residents lived near the Praia Grande beach, mainly concentrated in the region between the beach of Boqueirão, where is located the city center and beach Ocian. However, from the mid-1990s, the construction boom, which occurred through a series of infrastructure works, landscaping and urbanization, which until then were too poor, eventually attracting thousands of families in the municipality, search of jobs with contractors and builders, causing a huge swelling population in the region between the current South Expressway, the Rodovia Padre Manoel da Nóbrega and the Serra do Mar creating suburbs, as Quiet Garden, Ribeiropolis, Garden Fern, among others, but now, since all are in the process of urbanization with schools, kindergartens, public transport and flooring in most of its streets, as well as future investments made by the city size at these sites, such as 16 million dollars to be invested in the suburb Glory, in its complete redevelopment.

== Bathing Resort ==
Praia Grande is one of 15 cities considered spas by São Paulo state, which complied with certain prerequisites set by State Law. There are other cities that are not spas, they are still tourist resorts. This status ensures these municipalities a larger budget from the state through the Department of Field Support Offices of the State of São Paulo for the promotion of regional tourism. Also, the municipality acquires the right to add your name next to the title of Bathing Resort (Portuguese: Estância Balneária), term by which is designated by both the municipal official or expedient for the reference state.

== Neighborhoods ==
Praia Grande is divided into three districts: the Main/Seat District, Samaná, in the highlands, and Solemar, near the border with Mongaguá.

The neighborhoods can be classified between coastal ones, which are located between the Padre Manoel da Nóbrega Highway and the beach, peripheral, located on the residential area between the highway and the Piaçabuçu river and its foothills, and the mountainous region of Samaná. Since 1992, each neighborhood has been identified with a different color, inserted in all public IDs for each district.

Also, some neighborhoods are subdivided into smaller regions called Administrative Squares, which once made more specific addresses, helping the service of the local post office, currently serving to group places that have features common to the municipal administration work in some specific need.

The municipality contains part of the 901-hectare (2,230-acre) Xixová-Japuí State Park, created in 1993.

== Infoway ==
Praia Grande was the first Brazilian city to install the Information Highway, a fiber optic interconnection of all municipal government offices, which resulted in more than 300 km of cables installed in the main streets and avenues. With this network was also possible to install more than 1,200 video cameras along the busiest places of the city as well as in public buildings and monuments. The entire city is monitored by these cameras, a central, directly interconnected with the Municipal Guard and the Military Police. Thus, rates of police incidents fell 60% and vandalism of public facilities in the city by 40%.

Today, Praia Grande is the city with the largest number of surveillance cameras in the Americas, and the second in the world, second only to London, United Kingdom. There is a program of installation, the next two years (from 2007), 900 more cameras, overtaking even London in the amount of cameras installed.

In addition to monitoring, the Infoway allows data access to any unit of municipal institutions, in real time. This facilitates, for example, medical care, because even before the patient hold the first consultation, the doctor will have access to the entire history of every patient in the care of the municipal health network, including by which medical specialties which there have been consultations, tests, prescription drugs, allergies, and everything else that is part of history.

== Media ==
In telecommunications, the city was served by the Telecomunicações de São Paulo. In July 1998, this company was acquired by Telefónica, which adopted the Vivo brand in 2012. The company is currently an operator of cell phones, fixed lines, internet (fiber optics/4G) and television (satellite and cable).

== Distance from near cities ==
City	Distance
Bertioga	40 km
Cubatão	18 km
Guarujá	30 km
Itanhaém	43 km
Mongaguá	24 km
Peruíbe	74 km
São Paulo	72 km
Santos	12 km
São Vicente	6 km

== Tourism ==
Tourism in Praia Grande is centered on its 22.5 km (14.0 mi) coastline, which has an urbanized promenade with cycle paths, kiosks, playgrounds and other recreational facilities. Other attractions include the Itaipu Fortress, located in an area of Atlantic Forest overlooking Santos Bay; the Ézio Dall’Acqua Leisure Area, commonly known as Portinho, which contains playgrounds, a fishing deck and an environmental museum; and the Palácio das Artes cultural complex, which hosts theatrical performances and art exhibitions.

== See also ==
- List of municipalities in São Paulo
