= 2016 European Boxing Olympic Qualification Tournament =

Boxing competitions

- Venue: Mustafa Dağıstanlı Sports Hall
- Location: İlkadım, Samsun, Turkey
- Start date: April 9, 2016
- End date: April 17, 2016

The 2016 European Boxing Olympic Qualification Tournament for the boxing tournament at the 2016 Summer Olympics in Rio de Janeiro, Brazil, were held from April 9 to April 17, 2016 in the Mustafa Dağıstanlı Sports Hall at İlkadım, Samsun, Turkey.

== Medalists ==
=== Men ===
Event	Gold	Silver	Bronze
−49 kg	Galal Yafai (GBR)	Artur Hovhannisyan (ARM)	Manuel Cappai (ITA)
−49 kg	Galal Yafai (GBR)	Artur Hovhannisyan (ARM)	Samuel Carmona (ESP)
−52 kg	Muhammad Ali (GBR)	Narek Abgaryan (ARM)	Brendan Irvine (IRL)
−52 kg	Muhammad Ali (GBR)	Narek Abgaryan (ARM)	Daniel Asenov (BUL)
−56 kg	Javid Chalabiyev (AZE)	Qais Ashfaq (GBR)	Aram Avagyan (ARM)
−56 kg	Javid Chalabiyev (AZE)	Qais Ashfaq (GBR)	Mykola Butsenko (UKR)
−60 kg	Sofiane Oumiha (FRA)	Joseph Cordina (GBR)	David Joyce (IRL)
−60 kg	Sofiane Oumiha (FRA)	Joseph Cordina (GBR)	Volkan Gökçek (TUR)
−64 kg	Lorenzo Sotomayor (AZE)	Evaldas Petrauskas (LTU)	Batuhan Gozgec (TUR)
−64 kg	Lorenzo Sotomayor (AZE)	Evaldas Petrauskas (LTU)	Hovhannes Bachkov (ARM)
−69 kg	Eimantas Stanionis (LTU)	Vincenzo Mangiacapre (ITA)	Vladimir Margaryan (ARM)
−69 kg	Eimantas Stanionis (LTU)	Vincenzo Mangiacapre (ITA)	Vasile Belous (MDA)
−75 kg	Christian Mbilli (FRA)	Zoltán Harcsa (HUN)	Anthony Fowler (GBR)
−75 kg	Christian Mbilli (FRA)	Zoltán Harcsa (HUN)	Xhek Paskali (GER)
−81 kg	Joshua Buatsi (GBR)	Peter Müllenberg (NED)	Mehmet Ünal (TUR)
−81 kg	Joshua Buatsi (GBR)	Peter Müllenberg (NED)	Oleksandr Khyzhniak (UKR)
−91 kg	Lawrence Okolie (GBR)	Paul Omba Biongolo (FRA)	Abdulkadir Abdullayev (AZE)
−91 kg	Lawrence Okolie (GBR)	Paul Omba Biongolo (FRA)	Gevorg Manukian (UKR)
+91 kg	Joseph Joyce (GBR)	Magomedrasul Majidov (AZE)	Ali Eren Demirezen (TUR)
+91 kg	Joseph Joyce (GBR)	Magomedrasul Majidov (AZE)	István Bernáth (HUN)

=== Women ===
Event	Gold	Silver	Bronze
−51 kg	Nicola Adams (GBR)	Stanimira Petrova (BUL)	Tetyana Kob (UKR)
−51 kg	Nicola Adams (GBR)	Stanimira Petrova (BUL)	Marielle Hansen (DEN)
−60 kg	Yana Alekseevna (AZE)	Irma Testa (ITA)	Katie Taylor (IRL)
−60 kg	Yana Alekseevna (AZE)	Irma Testa (ITA)	Svetlana Staneva (BUL)
−75 kg	Yaroslava Yakushina (RUS)	Anna Laurell Nash (SWE)	Sarah Scheurich (GER)
−75 kg	Yaroslava Yakushina (RUS)	Anna Laurell Nash (SWE)	Petra Szatmári (HUN)

== Qualification summary ==
NOC	Men										Women			Total
NOC	49	52	56	60	64	69	75	81	91	+91	51	60	75	Total
Armenia	X	X	X			X								4
Azerbaijan			X		X				X	X		X		4
Bulgaria											X			1
France				X			X		X					3
Great Britain	X	X	X	X			X	X	X	X	X			9
Hungary							X							1
Ireland		X		X										2
Italy	X					X						X		3
Lithuania					X	X								2
Netherlands								X						1
Russia													X	1
Sweden													X	1
Turkey					X			X		X				3
Total: 13 NOCs	3	3	3	3	3	3	3	3	3	3	2	2	2	36

== Results ==
=== Men ===
==== Light flyweight (49 kg) ====
The top three boxers qualified to the 2016 Summer Olympics.

Round of 16
Hamza Kartal (TUR)	1
Manuel Cappai (ITA)	2
Artur Hovhannisyan (ARM)	3
Tinko Banabakov (BUL)	0
Dawid Jagodziński (POL)	0
Christos Cherakis (GER)	3
Amis Enver (ROU)	0
Galal Yafai (GBR)	3
Danill Platonovschi (MDA)	2
Kirill Serikov (EST)	1
Gábor Virbán (HUN)	0
Samuel Carmona (ESP)	3

Quarterfinals
Dmytro Zamotaev (UKR)	1
Manuel Cappai (ITA)	2
Artur Hovhannisyan (ARM)	3
Christos Cherakis (GER)	0
Galal Yafai (GBR)	DSQ
Danill Platonovschi (MDA)
Samuel Carmona (ESP)	3
Rufat Huseynov (AZE)	0

Semifinals
Manuel Cappai (ITA)	0
Artur Hovhannisyan (ARM)	3
Galal Yafai (GBR)	3
Samuel Carmona (ESP)	0

Final
Artur Hovhannisyan (ARM)	0
Galal Yafai (GBR)	3
Olympic box-off
Manuel Cappai (ITA)	3
Samuel Carmona (ESP)	0

==== Flyweight (52 kg) ====
The top three boxers qualified to the 2016 Summer Olympics.

Round of 32
	Score	
Hamza Touba (GER)	3–0	Siarhei Loban (BLR)

Round of 16
Brendan Irvine (IRL)	3
Hamza Touba (GER)	0
Hakan Çiğdem (TUR)	0
Elie Konki (FRA)	3
Narek Abgaryan (ARM)	3
Maciej Jóźwik (POL)	0
Alexandru Ionita (ROU)	0
Vincenzo Picardi (ITA)	3
Daniel Asenov (BUL)	3
Alexandr Riscan (MDA)	0
Gabriel Escobar (ESP)	0
Avtandil Tchubabria (GEO)	3
Ihor Sopinskyi (UKR)	2
Dodji Ayigah (BEL)	1
Nándor Csóka (HUN)	0
Muhammad Ali (GBR)	3

Quarterfinals
Brendan Irvine (IRL)	2
Elie Konki (FRA)	1
Narek Abgaryan (ARM)	3
Vincenzo Picardi (ITA)	0
Daniel Asenov (BUL)	3
Avtandil Tchubabria (GEO)	0
Ihor Sopinskyi (UKR)	0
Muhammad Ali (GBR)	3

Semifinals
Brendan Irvine (IRL)	0
Narek Abgaryan (ARM)	3
Daniel Asenov (BUL)	0
Muhammad Ali (GBR)	3

Final
Narek Abgaryan (ARM)	0
Muhammad Ali (GBR)	3
Olympic box-off
Brendan Irvine (IRL)	3
Daniel Asenov (BUL)	0

==== Bantamweight (56 kg) ====
The top three boxers qualified to the 2016 Summer Olympics.

Round of 16
Qais Ashfaq (GBR)	3
Merab Turkadze (GEO)	0
Adrian Kowal (POL)	2
Michal Takács (SVK)	1
Frederik Jensen (DEN)	3
Dositej Todorovski (SRB)	0
Sándor Tar (HUN)	0
Mykola Butsenko (UKR)	3
Ibrahim Gökçek (TUR)	3
Nicolae Andreiana (ROU)	0
Aram Avagyan (ARM)	3
Omar El-Hag (GER)	0
Igor Pertot (SLO)	0
Stefan Ivanov (BUL)	3
Veaceslav Gojan (MDA)
Javid Chalabiyev (AZE)	TKO

Quarterfinals
Qais Ashfaq (GBR)	3
Adrian Kowal (POL)	0
Frederik Jensen (DEN)	0
Mykola Butsenko (UKR)	3
Ibrahim Gökçek (TUR)	0
Aram Avagyan (ARM)	3
Stefan Ivanov (BUL)	0
Javid Chalabiyev (AZE)	3

Semifinals
Qais Ashfaq (GBR)	3
Mykola Butsenko (UKR)	0
Aram Avagyan (ARM)	0
Javid Chalabiyev (AZE)	3

Final
Qais Ashfaq (GBR)	0
Javid Chalabiyev (AZE)	3
Olympic box-off
Mykola Butsenko (UKR)	1
Aram Avagyan (ARM)	2

==== Lightweight (60 kg) ====
The top three boxers qualified to the 2016 Summer Olympics.

Round of 32
	Score	
Samvel Barseghyan (ARM)	1–2	Robert Harutyunyan (GER)
Matteo Komadina (CRO)	0–3	Artjoms Ramlavs (LAT)
Edgaras Skurdelis (LTU)	0–3	Volkan Gökçek (TUR)
Otar Eranosyan (GEO)	3–0	Bernard Torres (NOR)
Vazgen Safaryants (BLR)	3–0	Robert Jitaru (ROU)
Domenico Valentino (ITA)	2–0	Enrico Lacruz (NED)
Miklós Varga (HUN)	3–0	Michal Zátorský (SVK)

Round of 16
Sofiane Oumiha (FRA)	3
Robert Harutyunyan (GER)	0
Violant Sylejmani (KOS)
Hmajak Aperjan (CZE)	TKO
Tymur Beliak (UKR)	3
Artjoms Ramlavs (LAT)	0
Volkan Gökçek (TUR)	3
Elian Dimitrov (BUL)	0
David Joyce (IRL)	3
Otar Eranosyan (GEO)	0
Vazgen Safaryants (BLR)	3
Dawid Michelus (POL)	0
Dorin Bucșa (MDA)	0
Domenico Valentino (ITA)	3
Miklós Varga (HUN)	0
Joseph Cordina (GBR)	3

Quarterfinals
Sofiane Oumiha (FRA)	3
Hmajak Aperjan (CZE)	0
Tymur Beliak (UKR)	0
Volkan Gökçek (TUR)	3
David Joyce (IRL)	3
Vazgen Safaryants (BLR)	0
Domenico Valentino (ITA)
Joseph Cordina (GBR)	WO

Semifinals
Sofiane Oumiha (FRA)	3
Volkan Gökçek (TUR)	0
David Joyce (IRL)	0
Joseph Cordina (GBR)	3

Final
Sofiane Oumiha (FRA)	3
Joseph Cordina (GBR)	0
Olympic box-off
Volkan Gökçek (TUR)	1
David Joyce (IRL)	2

==== Light welterweight (64 kg) ====
The top three boxers qualified to the 2016 Summer Olympics.

Round of 32
	Score	
Erik Agateljan (CZE)	0–3	Dean Walsh (IRL)
Erik Pijetraj (CRO)	0–3	Hassan Amzile (FRA)
Hadi Srour (NOR)	0–3	Batuhan Gözgeç (TUR)
Enock Mwandila Poulsen (DEN)	3–0	Mateusz Kostecki (POL)
Antoine Vanackere (BEL)	TKO	Hovhannes Bachkov (ARM)
Yauheni Dauhaliavets (BLR)	2–1	Johann Orozco (ESP)

Round of 16
Lorenzo Sotomayor (AZE)	2
Dean Walsh (IRL)	1
Dimitri Galagot (MDA)	0
Alexandros Tsanikidis (GRE)	3
Artūrs Ahmetovs (LAT)	0
Hassan Amzile (FRA)	3
Batuhan Gözgeç (TUR)	TKO
Viktor Petrov (UKR)
Pat McCormack (GBR)	3
Enock Mwandila Poulsen (DEN)	0
Hovhannes Bachkov (ARM)	3
Vincenzo Arecchia (ITA)	0
Ninel Gheorghe (ROU)
Márk Kontrecz (HUN)	TKO
Yauheni Dauhaliavets (BLR)	0
Evaldas Petrauskas (LTU)	3

Quarterfinals
Lorenzo Sotomayor (AZE)	3
Alexandros Tsanikidis (GRE)	0
Hassan Amzile (FRA)	0
Batuhan Gözgeç (TUR)	3
Pat McCormack (GBR)	1
Hovhannes Bachkov (ARM)	2
Márk Kontrecz (HUN)	0
Evaldas Petrauskas (LTU)	3

Semifinals
Lorenzo Sotomayor (AZE)	3
Batuhan Gözgeç (TUR)	0
Hovhannes Bachkov (ARM)	0
Evaldas Petrauskas (LTU)	3

Final
Lorenzo Sotomayor (AZE)	3
Evaldas Petrauskas (LTU)	0
Olympic box-off
Batuhan Gözgeç (TUR)	3
Hovhannes Bachkov (ARM)	0

==== Welterweight (69 kg) ====
The top three boxers qualified to the 2016 Summer Olympics.

Round of 32
	Score	
Oliver Flodin (SWE)	0–3	Alban Beqiri (ALB)
Mikkel Nielsen (DEN)	3–0	Kaupo Arro (EST)
Damian Kiwior (POL)	0–3	Zdeněk Chládek (CZE)
Vahram Khudeda (SUI)	0–3	Geta Abashidze (GEO)
Cyrus Pattinson (GBR)	3–0	Muhammad Abdilrasoon (FIN)
Anas Messaoudi (BEL)	0–3	Simeon Chamov (BUL)
Adem Fetahović (BIH)	3–0	Yaroslav Samofalov (UKR)
Dimitrios Tsagkrakos (GRE)	0–3	Imre Bacskai (HUN)

Round of 16
Eimantas Stanionis (LTU)	3
Alban Beqiri (ALB)	0
Mikkel Nielsen (DEN)	1
Paulo Filipe Bernardes (POR)	2
Vasile Belous (MDA)	3
Zdeněk Chládek (CZE)	0
Geta Abashidze (GEO)	0
Pavel Kastramin (BLR)	3
Arajik Marutjan (GER)	0
Cyrus Pattinson (GBR)	3
Simeon Chamov (BUL)	0
Vladimir Margaryan (ARM)	3
Marian Pița (ROU)	0
Adem Fetahović (BIH)	3
Imre Bacskai (HUN)	1
Vincenzo Mangiacapre (ITA)	2

Quarterfinals
Eimantas Stanionis (LTU)	3
Paulo Filipe Bernardes (POR)	0
Vasile Belous (MDA)	2
Pavel Kastramin (BLR)	1
Cyrus Pattinson (GBR)	0
Vladimir Margaryan (ARM)	3
Adem Fetahović (BIH)	1
Vincenzo Mangiacapre (ITA)	2

Semifinals
Eimantas Stanionis (LTU)	3
Vasile Belous (MDA)	0
Vladimir Margaryan (ARM)	0
Vincenzo Mangiacapre (ITA)	3

Final
Eimantas Stanionis (LTU)	2
Vincenzo Mangiacapre (ITA)	1
Olympic box-off
Vasile Belous (MDA)	0
Vladimir Margaryan (ARM)	3

==== Middleweight (75 kg) ====
The top three boxers qualified to the 2016 Summer Olympics.

Round of 32
	Score	
Tomas Pivorun (LTU)	1–2	Ilari Kujala (FIN)
Damian Biacho Bolequia (ESP)	3–0	Aleksandar Drenovak (SRB)
Kamran Shakhsuvarly (AZE)	0–3	Christian Mbilli Assomo (FRA)
Antony Fowler (GBR)	3–0	Konstantine Khvistani (GEO)
Aljaž Venko (SLO)	1–2	Valeri Sirbu (MDA)
Martin Larsen (NOR)	0–3	Vít Král (CZE)
Max van der Pas (NED)	3-0	Davide Faraci (SUI)
Leon Chartoi (SWE)	0–3	Lay Kalenga Mishika (BEL)
Vitali Bandarenka (BLR)	3–0	Pavios Tsagkrakos (GRE)
Salvatore Cavallaro (ITA)	0–3	Arman Hovhikyan (ARM)
Ritti Ambago (DEN)	0–3	Zoltán Harcsa (HUN)
Arjon Kajoshi (ALB)	3–0	Luka Plantić (CRO)

Round of 16
Michael O'Reilly (IRL)	0
Ilari Kujala (FIN)	3
Damian Biacho Bolequia (ESP)	0
Christian Mbilli Assomo (FRA)	3
Antony Fowler (GBR)	3
Valeri Sirbu (MDA)	0
Vít Král (CZE)	0
Bogdan Juratoni (ROU)	3
Xhek Paskali (GER)	3
Max van der Pas (NED)	0
Lay Kalenga Mishika (BEL)	0
Vitali Bandarenka (BLR)	3
Arman Hovhikyan (ARM)	0
Zoltán Harcsa (HUN)	3
Arjon Kajoshi (ALB)	0
Dmytro Mytrofanov (UKR)	3

Quarterfinals
Ilari Kujala (FIN)	0
Christian Mbilli Assomo (FRA)	3
Antony Fowler (GBR)	2
Bogdan Juratoni (ROU)	1
Xhek Paskali (GER)	3
Vitali Bandarenka (BLR)	0
Zoltán Harcsa (HUN)	3
Dmytro Mytrofanov (UKR)	0

Semifinals
Christian Mbilli Assomo (FRA)	3
Antony Fowler (GBR)	0
Xhek Paskali (GER)	0
Zoltán Harcsa (HUN)	3

Final
Christian Mbilli Assomo (FRA)	WO
Zoltán Harcsa (HUN)
Olympic box-off
Antony Fowler (GBR)	3
Xhek Paskali (GER)	0

==== Light heavyweight (81 kg) ====
The top three boxers qualified to the 2016 Summer Olympics.

Round of 32
	Score	
Ainar Karlson (EST)	3–0	Alexandru Machedon (ROU)
Mehmet Ünal (TUR)	3–0	Nikoloz Sekhniashvili (GEO)
Georgii Kushitashvili (RUS)	3–0	Raitis Sinkēvičs (LAT)
Polyneikis Kalamaras (GRE)	1–2	Mateusz Tryc (POL)
Péter Tallosi (HUN)	0–3	Matúš Strnisko (SVK)
Joshua Buatsi (GBR)	3–0	Siarhei Novikau (BLR)
Klemen Turkuš (SLO)	1–2	Syrja Marinaj (ALB)

Round of 16
Peter Müllenberg (NED)	3
Ainar Karlson (EST)	0
Uke Smajli (SUI)	0
Surkho Shamilov (NOR)	3
Dzemal Bosnjak (BIH)	0
Mehmet Ünal (TUR)	3
Georgii Kushitashvili (RUS)	1
Teymur Mammadov (AZE)	2
Oleksandr Khyzhniak (UKR)	3
Mateusz Tryc (POL)	0
Matúš Strnisko (SVK)	3
Nikol Arutyunov (ARM)	0
Alejandro Camacho (ESP)	0
Joshua Buatsi (GBR)	3
Syrja Marinaj (ALB)	0
Serge Michel (GER)	3

Quarterfinals
Peter Müllenberg (NED)	3
Surkho Shamilov (NOR)	0
Mehmet Ünal (TUR)	2
Teymur Mammadov (AZE)	1
Oleksandr Khyzhniak (UKR)	3
Matúš Strnisko (SVK)	0
Joshua Buatsi (GBR)	3
Serge Michel (GER)	0

Semifinals
Peter Müllenberg (NED)	3
Mehmet Ünal (TUR)	0
Oleksandr Khyzhniak (UKR)	0
Joshua Buatsi (GBR)	3

Final
Peter Müllenberg (NED)	0
Joshua Buatsi (GBR)	3
Olympic box-off
Mehmet Ünal (TUR)	3
Oleksandr Khyzhniak (UKR)	0

==== Heavyweight (91 kg) ====
The top three boxers qualified to the 2016 Summer Olympics.

Round of 32
	Score	
Tadas Tamašauskas (LTU)	3–0	Milutin Stanković (SRB)
Rafayel Simonyan (ARM)	TKO	Kristiyan Dimitrov (BUL)
Lawrence Okolie (GBR)	TKO	Cristian Constantinov (MDA)
Paul Omba Biongolo (FRA)	3-0	Armend Xhoxhaj (KOS)
Siarhei Karneyeu (BLR)	0–3	Tomi Honka (FIN)

Round of 16
Abdulkadir Abdullayev (AZE)	3
Tadas Tamašauskas (LTU)	0
Darren O'Neill (IRL)	TKO
Gabriel Richards (SWE)
Seyda Keser (TUR)	3
Kristiyan Dimitrov (BUL)	0
Lawrence Okolie (GBR)	2
Roy Korving (NED)	1
Igor Jakubowski (POL)	1
Paul Omba Biongolo (FRA)	2
Nikolajs Grišuņins (LAT)
Alen Babić (CRO)	TKO
Erik Tlkanec (SVK)	0
Gergő Sávoly (HUN)	3
Tomi Honka (FIN)	0
Gevorg Manukian (UKR)	3

Quarterfinals
Abdulkadir Abdullayev (AZE)	2
Darren O'Neill (IRL)	1
Seyda Keser (TUR)	0
Lawrence Okolie (GBR)	3
Paul Omba Biongolo (FRA)	TKO
Alen Babić (CRO)
Gergő Sávoly (HUN)	0
Gevorg Manukian (UKR)	3

Semifinals
Abdulkadir Abdullayev (AZE)	0
Lawrence Okolie (GBR)	3
Paul Omba Biongolo (FRA)	3
Gevorg Manukian (UKR)	0

Final
Lawrence Okolie (GBR)	WO
Paul Omba Biongolo (FRA)
Olympic box-off
Abdulkadir Abdullayev (AZE)	3
Gevorg Manukian (UKR)	0

==== Super heavyweight (+91 kg) ====
The top three boxers qualified to the 2016 Summer Olympics.

Round of 32
	Score	
Daniel Taborsky (CZE)	TKO	Viktor Vykhryst (UKR)
Simen Nysater (NOR)	0–3	Dean Gardiner (IRL)
Ruben Nazaryan (BLR)	0–3	Alexei Zavatin (MDA)

Round of 16
Joseph Joyce (GBR)	3
Viktor Vykhryst (UKR)	0
Kem Larsen (DEN)	3
Mantas Valavičius (LTU)	0
István Bernáth (HUN)	TKO
Tim Jevscek (SLO)
Petar Belberov (BUL)	3
Maxim Babanin (RUS)	0
Magomedrasul Majidov (AZE)	3
Dean Gardiner (IRL)	0
Guido Vianello (ITA)	3
Vladan Babić (SRB)	0
Mikheil Bakhtidze (GEO)	0
Ruben Nazaryan (BEL)	3
Alexei Zavatin (MDA)	0
Ali Eren Demirezen (TUR)	3

Quarterfinals
Joseph Joyce (GBR)	3
Kem Larsen (DEN)	0
István Bernáth (HUN)	3
Petar Belberov (BUL)	0
Magomedrasul Majidov (AZE)	3
Guido Vianello (ITA)	0
Ruben Nazaryan (BEL)	0
Ali Eren Demirezen (TUR)	3

Semifinals
Joseph Joyce (GBR)	TKO
István Bernáth (HUN)
Magomedrasul Majidov (AZE)	3
Ali Eren Demirezen (TUR)	0

Final
Joseph Joyce (GBR)	2
Magomedrasul Majidov (AZE)	1
Olympic box-off
István Bernáth (HUN)
Ali Eren Demirezen (TUR)	WO

=== Women ===
==== Flyweight (51 kg) ====
The two finalists qualified to the 2016 Summer Olympics.

Round of 32
	Score	
Sandra Drabik (POL)	0–2	Neriman Istik (TUR)
Antonia Papoutsaki (GRE)	0–3	Anush Grigoryan (ARM)
Anakhanim Aghayeva (AZE)	1–2	Iulia Coroli (MDA)

Round of 16
Stanimira Petrova (BUL)	3
Neriman Istik (TUR)	0
Helena Envall (SWE)	0
Marzia Davide (ITA)	3
Tetyana Kob (UKR)	3
Pinar Touba (GER)	0
Ceire Smith (IRL)	3
Virginia Barankai (HUN)	0
Lacramioara Perijoc (ROU)	0
Anush Grigoryan (ARM)	3
Saiana Sagateva (RUS)	1
Marielle Hansen (DEN)	2
Sarah Ourahmoune (FRA)	3
Alicia Holzken (NED)	0
Iulia Coroli (MDA)	0
Nicola Adams (GBR)	3

Quarterfinals
Stanimira Petrova (BUL)	3
Marzia Davide (ITA)	0
Tetyana Kob (UKR)	2
Ceire Smith (IRL)	1
Anush Grigoryan (ARM)	1
Marielle Hansen (DEN)	2
Sarah Ourahmoune (FRA)	0
Nicola Adams (GBR)	3

Semifinals
Stanimira Petrova (BUL)	3
Tetyana Kob (UKR)	0
Marielle Hansen (DEN)	0
Nicola Adams (GBR)	3

Final
Stanimira Petrova (BUL)	0
Nicola Adams (GBR)	3
Bronze medal
Tetyana Kob (UKR)	3
Marielle Hansen (DEN)	0

==== Lightweight (60 kg) ====
The two finalists qualified to the 2016 Summer Olympics.

Round of 32
	Score	
Tasheena Bugar (GER)	0–3	Martina Schmoranzová (CZE)
Milena Matović (SRB)	TKO	Agnes Alexiusson (SWE)
Chantelle Cameron (GBR)	0–3	Yana Alekseevna (AZE)
Iuliia Tsyplakova (UKR)	0–3	Anastasiya Belyakova (RUS)
Nikoleta Pița (GRE)	0–3	Kinga Siwa (POL)

Round of 16
Katie Taylor (IRL)	3
Martina Schmoranzová (CZE)	0
Cristina-Paula Cosma (ROU)	0
Yvonne Rasmussen (DEN)	3
Jennifer Miranda (ESP)	0
Agnes Alexiusson (SWE)	3
Yana Alekseevna (AZE)	3
Gülsüm Tatar (TUR)	0
Sandra Brugger (SUI)	0
Anastasiya Belyakova (RUS)	3
Sara Benke (HUN)
Svetlana Staneva (BUL)	TKO
Irma Testa (ITA)	3
Mira Potkonen (FIN)	0
Kinga Siwa (POL)	0
Estelle Mossely (FRA)	3

Quarterfinals
Katie Taylor (IRL)	3
Yvonne Rasmussen (DEN)	0
Agnes Alexiusson (SWE)	0
Yana Alekseevna (AZE)	3
Anastasiya Belyakova (RUS)	1
Svetlana Staneva (BUL)	2
Irma Testa (ITA)	2
Estelle Mossely (FRA)	1

Semifinals
Katie Taylor (IRL)	0
Yana Alekseevna (AZE)	3
Svetlana Staneva (BUL)	1
Irma Testa (ITA)	2

Final
Yana Alekseevna (AZE)	2
Irma Testa (ITA)	1
Bronze medal
Katie Taylor (IRL)	3
Svetlana Staneva (BUL)	0

==== Middleweight (75 kg) ====
The two finalists qualified to the 2016 Summer Olympics.

Round of 16
Nouchka Fontijn (NED)	0
Christine Desmond (IRL)	2
Petra Szatmári (HUN)	2
Miriam Gutiérrez (ESP)	1
Savannah Marshall (GBR)	0
Erika Guerrier (FRA)	2
Lidia Fidura (POL)	0
Anna Laurell Nash (SWE)	3
Sarah Scheurich (GER)	3
Monica Floridia (ITA)	0
Florina Radu (ROU)	0
Anamarija Maršić (CRO)	3
Elena Vystropova (AZE)	0
Sema Çalışkan (TUR)	3
Mariya Bova (UKR)	0
Yaroslava Yakushina (RUS)	3

Quarterfinals
Christine Desmond (IRL)	0
Petra Szatmári (HUN)	3
Erika Guerrier (FRA)	1
Anna Laurell Nash (SWE)	2
Sarah Scheurich (GER)	3
Anamarija Maršić (CRO)	0
Sema Çalışkan (TUR)	0
Yaroslava Yakushina (RUS)	3

Semifinals
Petra Szatmári (HUN)	0
Anna Laurell Nash (SWE)	3
Sarah Scheurich (GER)	0
Yaroslava Yakushina (RUS)	3

Final
Anna Laurell Nash (SWE)	1
Yaroslava Yakushina (RUS)	2
Bronze medal
Petra Szatmári (HUN)	0
Sarah Scheurich (GER)	3
