= Boxing at the 2015 European Games – Men's 81 kg =

Boxing competitions

Men's light heavyweight boxing at the 2015 European Games
- Venue: Baku Crystal Hall
- Date: 17–25 June
- Competitors: 27 from 27 nations

Medalists
| gold medal | Teymur Mammadov | Azerbaijan |
| silver medal | Valentino Manfredonia | Italy |
| bronze medal | Pavel Silyagin | Russia |
| bronze medal | Oleksandr Khyzhniak | Ukraine |

The men's light heavyweight boxing 81 kg boxing event at the 2015 European Games in Baku was held from 17 to 25 June at the Baku Crystal Hall.

== Results ==
=== Final ===
| Final; 25 June |
| Valentino Manfredonia (ITA) | 0 |
| Teymur Mammadov (AZE) | 3 |

=== Top half ===
Round of 32; 17 June
Ukë Smajli (SUI) | 3
Alexandru Machedon (ROU) | 0
Polyneikis Kalamaras (GRE) | 0
Džemal Bošnjak (BIH) | 3
Siarhei Novikau (BLR) | 0
Souliman Abdourachidov (FRA) | 3
Ņikita Versockis (LAT) | 0
Norbert Harcsa (HUN) | 3
Nikoloz Sekhniashvili (GEO) | 0
Radoslav Pantaleev (BUL) | 3

Round of 16; 19 June
Valentino Manfredonia (ITA) | 3
Ukë Smajli (SUI) | 0
Džemal Bošnjak (BIH) | 2
Souliman Abdourachidov (FRA) | 1
Armend Xhoxhaj (KOS) | 3
Norbert Harcsa (HUN) | 0
Radoslav Pantaleev (BUL) | 1
Oleksandr Khyzhniak (UKR) | 2

Quarterfinals; 22 June
Valentino Manfredonia (ITA) | 2
Džemal Bošnjak (BIH) | 1
Armend Xhoxhaj (KOS) | 1
Oleksandr Khyzhniak (UKR) | 2

Semifinals; 24 June
Valentino Manfredonia (ITA) | 2
Oleksandr Khyzhniak (UKR) | 1

=== Bottom half ===
Round of 32; 17–18 June
Alejandro Camacho (ESP) | 0
Matúš Strnisko (SVK) | 3
Igor Teziev (GER) | 3
Petru Ciobanu (MDA) | 0
Ainar Karlson (EST) | 1
Boško Drašković (MNE) | 2
Joshua Buatsi (GBR) | 0
Teymur Mammadov (AZE) | 3
Jordan Kuliński (POL) | 3
Nikol Arutyunov (ARM) | 0
Denis Lazar (SLO)
Cem Karlıdağ (TUR) | TKO

Round of 16; 19 June
Pavel Silyagin (RUS) | 3
Matúš Strnisko (SVK) | 0
Igor Teziev (GER) | 3
Boško Drašković (MNE) | 0
Teymur Mammadov (AZE) | 3
Jordan Kuliński (POL) | 0
Cem Karlıdağ (TUR) | 0
Peter Müllenberg (NED) | 3

Quarterfinals; 22 June
Pavel Silyagin (RUS) | 3
Igor Teziev (GER) | 0
Teymur Mammadov (AZE) | 3
Peter Müllenberg (NED) | 0

Semifinals; 24 June
Pavel Silyagin (RUS) | 0
Teymur Mammadov (AZE) | 3
