= Boxing at the 2019 European Games – Men's 91 kg =

Boxing competitions

Men's heavyweight boxing at the 2019 European Games
- Venue: Uruchie Sports Palace
- Date: 21–30 June
- Competitors: 26 from 26 nations

Medalists
gold medal	Muslim Gadzhimagomedov	Russia
silver medal	Uladzislau Smiahlikau	Belarus
bronze medal	Toni Filipi	Croatia
bronze medal	Cheavon Clarke	Great Britain

The men's heavyweight 91 kg boxing event at the 2019 European Games in Minsk was held from 21 to 30 June at the Uruchie Sports Palace.

== Results ==
=== Final ===
Final; 30 June
Uladzislau Smiahlikau (BLR)	0
Muslim Gadzhimagomedov (RUS)	5

=== Top half ===
Round of 32; 21 June
Ainar Karlson (EST)	3
Tomasz Niedźwiecki (POL)	2
Berat Acar (TUR)	5
Andrei Zatuşevschii (MDA)	0
Peter Müllenberg (NED)	4
Henrik Sargsyan (ARM)	1
Krenar Aliu (FIN)	3
Alberto Biro (ROU)	2
Michel Erpelding (LUX)	0
Nikoloz Begadze (GEO)	5

Round of 16; 23 June
Cheavon Clarke (GBR)	5
Ainar Karlson (EST)	0
Berat Acar (TUR)	2
Peter Müllenberg (NED)	3
Uladzislau Smiahlikau (BLR)	5
Krenar Aliu (FIN)	0
Nikoloz Begadze (GEO)	4
Ramazan Muslimov (UKR)	1

Quarterfinals; 25 June
Cheavon Clarke (GBR)	5
Peter Müllenberg (NED)	0
Uladzislau Smiahlikau (BLR)	3
Nikoloz Begadze (GEO)	2

Semifinals; 28 June
Cheavon Clarke (GBR)	1
Uladzislau Smiahlikau (BLR)	4

=== Bottom half ===
Round of 32; 21 June
Rahil Mammadli (AZE)	0
Radoslav Pantaleev (BUL)	5
Toni Filipi (CRO)	3
Džemal Bošnjak (BIH)	2
Dávid Michálek (SVK)	0
Aziz Mouhiidine (ITA)	5
Slobodan Jovanović (SRB)
Eugen Waigel (GER)	WO
Ahmed Hagag (AUT)	0
Victor Schelstraete (BEL)	5

Round of 16; 23 June
Ádám Hámori (HUN)	3
Radoslav Pantaleev (BUL)	2
Toni Filipi (CRO)	4
Anthony Browne (IRL)	1
Aziz Mouhiidine (ITA)	5
Eugen Waigel (GER)	0
Victor Schelstraete (BEL)	0
Muslim Gadzhimagomedov (RUS)	5

Quarterfinals; 25 June
Ádám Hámori (HUN)	2
Toni Filipi (CRO)	3
Aziz Mouhiidine (ITA)	0
Muslim Gadzhimagomedov (RUS)	5

Semifinals; 28 June
Toni Filipi (CRO)	0
Muslim Gadzhimagomedov (RUS)	5
