= 2008 European Union Amateur Boxing Championships =

Boxing competitions

2008 Men's European Union Boxing Championships
- Host city: Cetniewo
- Country: Poland
- Athletes: 119
- Dates: 15–22 June

The Men's 2008 European Union Amateur Boxing Championships were held in Cetniewo, Poland from June 15 to June 22. The 6th edition of the annual competition was organised by the European governing body for amateur boxing, EABA. A total number of 119 fighters from across Europe competed at these championships.

== Medal winners ==
Event	Gold	Silver	Bronze
Light Flyweight (– 48 kilograms)	Pal Bedak; Hungary	(Republic of Ireland) Paddy Barnes; Ireland	Łukasz Maszczyk; Poland
Flyweight (– 51 kilograms)	Rafał Kaczor; Poland	Khalid Saeed Yafai; England	Redouane Asloum; France Vincenzo Picardi; Italy
Bantamweight (– 54 kilograms)	(Republic of Ireland) John Joe Nevin; Ireland	Mateusz Mazik; Poland	Rafael Pujol; Spain Hafid Bouji; Germany
Featherweight (– 57 kilograms)	(Republic of Ireland) David Oliver Joyce; Ireland	Mirsad Ahmeti; Croatia	Michał Chudecki; Poland Hicham Ziouti; France
Lightweight (– 60 kilograms)	Thomas Stalker; England	Miklos Varga; Hungary	Artur Schmidt; Germany Rachid Azzedine; France
Light Welterweight (– 64 kilograms)	Frankie Gavin; England	Gyula Kate; Hungary	Mustafa Doğan; Turkey Marcin Łęgowski; Poland
Welterweight (– 69 kilograms)	Billy Joe Saunders; England	Dieter Doehl; Germany	Xavier Noel; France Mariusz Koperski; Poland
Middleweight (– 75 kilograms)	(Republic of Ireland) Darren Sutherland; Ireland	James Degale; England	Caner Sayak; Turkey Stefan Haertel; Germany
Light Heavyweight (– 81 kilograms)	(Republic of Ireland) Kenneth Egan; Ireland	Tony Jeffries; England	Imre Szello; Hungary Ömer Aydoğan; Turkey
Heavyweight (– 91 kilograms)	Helias Pavlidis; Greece	(Republic of Ireland) Con Sheehan; Ireland	Vahagn Sahakyan; Germany Warren Baister; England
Super Heavyweight (+ 91 kilograms)	David Price; England	István Bernáth; Hungary	Samet Keskin; Turkey Krzysztof Głowacki; Poland
