= Mamazulunov =

Mamazulunov (Cyrillic Uzbek and Russian Мамазулунов) is a surname. Notable people with the surname include:

- Oybek Mamazulunov, Uzbekistani boxer
- Sher Mamazulunov (born 1995), Uzbekistani kickboxer
