= 2013 AIBA World Boxing Championships – Light heavyweight =

Boxing competitions

The Light heavyweight competition at the 2013 AIBA World Boxing Championships was held from 16 to 26 October 2013. Boxers were limited to a weight of 81 kilograms.

== Medalists ==
Gold	Julio César la Cruz (CUB)
Silver	Adilbek Niyazymbetov (KAZ)
Bronze	Oybek Mamazulunov (UZB)
Bronze	Joe Ward (IRL)

== Seeds ==
1. (Kazakhstan) Adilbek Niyazymbetov (final)
2. (Cuba) Julio César la Cruz (champion)
3. (Russia) Nikita Ivanov (quarterfinals)
4. (Uzbekistan) Oybek Mamazulunov (semifinals)
5. (Netherlands) Peter Mullenberg (quarterfinals)
6. (Republic of Ireland) Joe Ward (semifinals)
7. (Croatia) Hrvoje Sep (second round)
8. (Belarus) Siarhei Novikau (third round)
9. (Moldova) Petru Ciobanu (second round)
10. (Algeria) Abdelhafid Benchabla (quarterfinals)

== Draw ==
=== Finals ===
Semifinals
1	(Kazakhstan) Adilbek Niyazymbetov	3
4	(Uzbekistan) Oybek Mamazulunov	0
3	(Republic of Ireland) Joe Ward	0
2	(Cuba) Julio César la Cruz	3

Final
(Kazakhstan) Adilbek Niyazymbetov	1
(Cuba) Julio César la Cruz	2

=== Top half ===
==== Section 1 ====
First Round
(Nepal) Deepak Maharjan	0
(Finland) Ville Hukkanen	3
(China) Zhang Aolin	0
(South Korea) Kim Hyeong-Kyu	3

Second Round
(Kazakhstan) Adilbek Niyazymbetov	3
(Finland) Ville Hukkanen	0
(Bulgaria) Radoslav Pantaleev	0
(Kosovo) Armend Xhoxhaj	3
(Moldova) Petru Ciobanu	1
(India) Sumit Sangwan	2
(South Korea) Kim Hyeong-Kyu	0
(Belarus) Siarhei Novikau	3

Third Round
(Kazakhstan) Adilbek Niyazymbetov	3
(Kosovo) Armend Xhoxhaj	0
(India) Sumit Sangwan	3
(Belarus) Siarhei Novikau	0

Quarterfinals
(Kazakhstan) Adilbek Niyazymbetov	3
(India) Sumit Sangwan	0

==== Section 2 ====
First Round
(Turkmenistan) Arslanbek Achilov	3
(Kyrgyzstan) Aleksandr Panarin	0
(Mongolia) Sandagsurengiin Erdenebayar	TKO
(United States) Geremias Torres

Second Round
(Netherlands) Peter Mullenberg	2
(Turkmenistan) Arslanbek Achilov	1
(Denmark) Martin Pedersen	0
(Scotland) Scott Forrest	3
(Latvia) Nikolajs Grišuņins	0
(Bosnia and Herzegovina) Džemal Bosnjak	3
(Mongolia) Sandagsurengiin Erdenebayar	0
(Uzbekistan) Oybek Mamazulunov	3

Third Round
(Netherlands) Peter Mullenberg	3
(Scotland) Scott Forrest	0
(Bosnia and Herzegovina) Džemal Bosnjak	0
(Uzbekistan) Oybek Mamazulunov	3

Quarterfinals
(Netherlands) Peter Mullenberg	0
(Uzbekistan) Oybek Mamazulunov	3

=== Bottom half ===
==== Section 3 ====
First Round
(Mauritius) Joseph St. Pierre	0
(Turkey) Avni Yildirim	3
(Poland) Mateusz Tryc	2
(Azerbaijan) Rauf Rahimov	1

Second Round
(Russia) Nikita Ivanov	3
(Turkey) Avni Yildirim	0
(Italy) Simone Fiori	3
(Kenya) Elly Ochola	0
(Australia) Dylan Hardy	0
(Hungary) Norbert Harcsa	2
(Poland) Mateusz Tryc	0
(Republic of Ireland) Joe Ward	3

Third Round
(Russia) Nikita Ivanov	2
(Italy) Simone Fiori	1
(Hungary) Norbert Harcsa	0
(Republic of Ireland) Joe Ward	3

Quarterfinals
(Russia) Nikita Ivanov	0
(Republic of Ireland) Joe Ward	3

==== Section 4 ====
First Round
(Nicaragua) Osmar Amador
(Syria) Ali Ghoussoun	TKO
(Germany) Serge Michel	3
(Georgia (country)) Iago Kiziria	0

Second Round
(Croatia) Hrvoje Sep	1
(Syria) Ali Ghoussoun	2
(Montenegro) Boško Drašković	0
(Algeria) Abdelhafid Benchabla	3
(Ukraine) Oleksandr Ganzulia	3
(Venezuela) Endry Pinto	0
(Germany) Serge Michel	0
(Cuba) Julio César la Cruz	3

Third Round
(Syria) Ali Ghoussoun	0
(Algeria) Abdelhafid Benchabla	3
(Ukraine) Oleksandr Ganzulia	0
(Cuba) Julio César la Cruz	3

Quarterfinals
(Algeria) Abdelhafid Benchabla	0
(Cuba) Julio César la Cruz	3
