= Armenia at the 2016 Summer Olympics =

- IOC code: ARM
- NOC: National Olympic Committee of Armenia
- Website: www.armnoc.am (in Armenian)

in Rio de Janeiro
- Competitors: 32 in 8 sports
- Flag bearer: Vahan Mkhitaryan
- Medals Ranked 42nd: Gold 1 Silver 3 Bronze 0 Total 4

Summer Olympics appearances (overview)
- 1996; 2000; 2004; 2008; 2012; 2016; 2020; 2024

Other related appearances
- Russian Empire (1900–1912); Soviet Union (1952–1988); Unified Team (1992)

Armenia competed at the 2016 Summer Olympics in Rio de Janeiro, Brazil, from 5 to 21 August 2016. It was the nation's sixth consecutive appearance at the Summer Olympics in the post-Soviet era.

The National Olympic Committee of Armenia fielded a team of 32 athletes, 24 men and 8 women, across eight different sports at the Games. It was the nation's largest ever team sent to the Olympics, tying the record with the number of athletes achieved in Atlanta two decades earlier. The Armenian roster also highlighted its first ever female artistic gymnast, as well as the most female participation in its Olympic history.

Of the 32 participants, five of them competed at London 2012, including Greco-Roman wrestlers Arsen Julfalakyan (74 kg), who succeeded his father and head coach Levon to ascend the podium by taking the silver medal, and Artur Aleksanyan, who won a bronze in the heavyweight category, and later emerged himself as the reigning world champion twice (2013 and 2015). Other notable Armenian athletes featured American-born gymnast Houry Gebeshian, rifle shooter and 2014 Youth Olympic medalist Hrachik Babayan, and freestyle swimmer Vahan Mkhitaryan, who was selected by the committee to lead his delegation as the flag bearer in the opening ceremony.

Armenia left Rio de Janeiro with four medals (one gold and three silver), being considered its most successful Olympics since 1996. Among the nation's medalists were weightlifters Simon Martirosyan and Gor Minasyan, who each obtained silver in their respective weight categories, and Aleksanyan, who made history as Armenia's first ever Olympic champion after two decades, adding a gold to his career treasury of two world and three European titles.

== Medalists ==
Medal	Name	Sport	Event	Date
Gold	Artur Aleksanyan	Wrestling	Men's Greco-Roman 98 kg	16 August
Silver	Simon Martirosyan	Weightlifting	Men's 105 kg	15 August
Silver	Migran Arutyunyan	Wrestling	Men's Greco-Roman 66 kg	16 August
Silver	Gor Minasyan	Weightlifting	Men's +105 kg	16 August

== Competitors ==
Sport	Men	Women	Total
Athletics	1	4	5
Boxing	5	0	5
Gymnastics	2	1	3
Judo	1	0	1
Shooting	1	0	1
Swimming	1	1	2
Weightlifting	5	2	7
Wrestling	8	0	8
Total	24	8	32

== Athletics ==
Armenian athletes have so far achieved qualifying standards in the following athletics events (up to a maximum of 3 athletes in each event):

Key

- Note–Ranks given for track events are within the athlete's heat only
- Q = Qualified for the next round
- q = Qualified for the next round as a fastest loser or, in field events, by position without achieving the qualifying target
- NR = National record
- N/A = Round not applicable for the event
- Bye = Athlete not required to compete in round

Track & road events

Athlete	Event	Heat		Semifinal		Final	
Athlete	Event	Result	Rank	Result	Rank	Result	Rank
Gayane Chiloyan	Women's 200 m	25.03	8	Did not advance			
Diana Khubeseryan	Women's 200 m	25.16	7	Did not advance			
Lilit Harutyunyan	Women's 400 m hurdles	1:03.13	7	Did not advance			

Field events

Athlete	Event	Qualification		Final	
Athlete	Event	Distance	Position	Distance	Position
Levon Aghasyan	Men's triple jump	15.54	36	Did not advance	
Amaliya Sharoyan	Women's long jump	5.95	18	Did not advance	

== Boxing ==
Armenia entered five boxers to compete in each of the following weight classes into the Olympic boxing tournament. Artur Hovhannisyan, Narek Abgaryan, Aram Avagyan, and Vladimir Margaryan had claimed their Olympic spots at the 2016 European Qualification Tournament in Samsun, Turkey. Meanwhile, light welterweight boxer Hovhannes Bachkov secured an additional place on the Armenian roster with his semifinal triumph at the 2016 APB and WSB Olympic Qualifier in Vargas, Venezuela.

Athlete	Event	Round of 32	Round of 16	Quarterfinals	Semifinals	Final	
Athlete	Event	Opposition Result	Opposition Result	Opposition Result	Opposition Result	Opposition Result	Rank
Artur Hovhannisyan	Men's light flyweight	Carmona (ESP); L 0–3	Did not advance				
Narek Abgaryan	Men's flyweight	Serugo (UGA); W 2–1	Hu Jg (CHN); L 0–3	Did not advance			
Aram Avagyan	Men's bantamweight	Morisaka (JPN); W 2–1	Conlan (IRL); L 0–3	Did not advance			
Hovhannes Bachkov	Men's light welterweight	Arcón (VEN); W 2–1	Hu Qx (CHN); L 1–2	Did not advance			
Vladimir Margaryan	Men's welterweight	Hill (FIJ); W 3–0	Iglesias (CUB); L TKO	Did not advance			

== Gymnastics ==
=== Artistic ===
Armenia entered three artistic gymnasts into the Olympic competition, including a first female Armenian gymnast. Harutyun Merdinyan had claimed his Olympic spot in the men's apparatus and all-around events at the 2015 World Championships, while two-time Olympian Artur Davtyan performed the same feat, as well as Houry Gebeshian in the women's at the Olympic Test Event in Rio de Janeiro.

Men

Athlete	Event	Qualification								Final							
Athlete	Event	Apparatus						Total	Rank	Apparatus						Total	Rank
Athlete	Event	F	PH	R	V	PB	HB	Total	Rank	F	PH	R	V	PB	HB	Total	Rank
Artur Davtyan	Vault	—			14.566	—		14.566	11	Did not advance							
Harutyun Merdinyan	Pommel horse	—	15.583	—				15.583	4 Q	—	14.933	—				14.933	7

Women

Athlete	Event	Qualification						Final					
Athlete	Event	Apparatus				Total	Rank	Apparatus				Total	Rank
Athlete	Event	V	UB	BB	F	Total	Rank	V	UB	BB	F	Total	Rank
Houry Gebeshian	All-around	14.016	13.666	13.266	12.900	53.848	38	Did not advance					

== Judo ==
Armenia qualified one judoka for the men's extra-lightweight category (60 kg) at the Games. London 2012 Olympian Hovhannes Davtyan was ranked among the top 22 eligible judokas for men in the IJF World Ranking List of 30 May 2016.

Athlete	Event	Round of 64	Round of 32	Round of 16	Quarterfinals	Semifinals	Repechage	Final / BM	
Athlete	Event	Opposition Result	Opposition Result	Opposition Result	Opposition Result	Opposition Result	Opposition Result	Opposition Result	Rank
Hovhannes Davtyan	Men's −60 kg	Bye	Paischer (AUT); W 100–000	Mudranov (RUS); L 000–001	Did not advance				

== Shooting ==
Armenia received an invitation from ISSF to send 2014 Youth Olympic silver medalist Hrachik Babayan in the men's rifle events to the Olympics, as long as the minimum qualifying score (MQS) was met by 31 March 2016.

Athlete	Event	Qualification		Final	
Athlete	Event	Points	Rank	Points	Rank
Hrachik Babayan	Men's 10 m air rifle	621.5	24	Did not advance	

Qualification Legend: Q = Qualify for the next round; q = Qualify for the bronze medal (shotgun)

== Swimming ==
Armenia received a Universality invitation from FINA to send two swimmers (one male and one female) to the Olympics.

Athlete	Event	Heat		Semifinal		Final	
Athlete	Event	Time	Rank	Time	Rank	Time	Rank
Vahan Mkhitaryan	Men's 50 m freestyle	23.50	47	Did not advance			
Monika Vasilyan	Women's 50 m freestyle	DNS		Did not advance			

== Weightlifting ==
Armenian weightlifters have qualified five men's and two women's quota places for the Rio Olympics based on their combined team standing by points at the 2014 and 2015 IWF World Championships. The team must allocate these places to individual athletes by 20 June 2016.

Men

Athlete	Event	Snatch		Clean & Jerk		Total	Rank
Athlete	Event	Result	Rank	Result	Rank	Total	Rank
Andranik Karapetyan	−77 kg	174	2	~~195~~	DNF	174	DNF
Arakel Mirzoyan	−85 kg	158	=10	—	—	158	DNF
Simon Martirosyan	−105 kg	190	=4	227	2	417	2nd place, silver medalist(s)
Ruben Aleksanyan	+105 kg	195	=4	245	2	440	4
Gor Minasyan	+105 kg	210	2	241	=4	451	2nd place, silver medalist(s)

Women

Athlete	Event	Snatch		Clean & Jerk		Total	Rank
Athlete	Event	Result	Rank	Result	Rank	Total	Rank
Nazik Avdalyan	−69 kg	107	5	135	5	242	5
Sona Poghosyan	−75 kg	97	11	126	10	223	10

== Wrestling ==
Armenia qualified a total of eight wrestlers for each of the following weight classes into the Olympic competition. Three of them finished among the top six to book Olympic spots each in the men's freestyle 125 kg and men's Greco-Roman (66 & 98 kg) at the 2015 World Championships, while two additional licenses were awarded to Armenian wrestlers, who progressed to the top two finals in men's freestyle 57 kg at the 2016 European Qualification Tournament.

Three further wrestlers had claimed the remaining Olympic slots to round out the Armenian roster at the initial meet of the World Qualification Tournament in Ulaanbaatar.

On 11 May 2016, United World Wrestling awarded an additional Olympic license to Armenia in men's freestyle 65 kg, as a response to the doping violations for both the Polish and Ukrainian wrestler at the European Qualification Tournament.

Key:

- VT – Victory by Fall.
- PP – Decision by Points – the loser with technical points.
- PO – Decision by Points – the loser without technical points.
- ST – Technical superiority – the loser without technical points and a margin of victory of at least 8 (Greco-Roman) or 10 (freestyle) points.

Men's freestyle

Athlete	Event	Qualification	Round of 16	Quarterfinal	Semifinal	Repechage 1	Repechage 2	Final / BM	
Athlete	Event	Opposition Result	Opposition Result	Opposition Result	Opposition Result	Opposition Result	Opposition Result	Opposition Result	Rank
Garnik Mnatsakanyan	−57 kg	Bye	Rahimi (IRI); L 0–4 ^{ST}	Did not advance					20
David Safaryan	−65 kg	Bye	Chamizo (ITA); L 1–3 ^{PP}	Did not advance					18
Georgy Ketoyev	−97 kg	Bye	Odikadze (GEO); L 1–3 ^{PP}	Did not advance					14
Levan Berianidze	−125 kg	Bye	Deng Zw (CHN); W 3–1 ^{PP}	Ligeti (HUN); W 3–1 ^{PP}	Akgül (TUR); L 1–3 ^{PP}	Bye		Saidau (BLR); L 1–3 ^{PP}	5

Men's Greco-Roman

Athlete	Event	Qualification	Round of 16	Quarterfinal	Semifinal	Repechage 1	Repechage 2	Final / BM	
Athlete	Event	Opposition Result	Opposition Result	Opposition Result	Opposition Result	Opposition Result	Opposition Result	Opposition Result	Rank
Migran Arutyunyan	−66 kg	Bye	Saleh (EGY); W 9–0 ^{ST}	Ryu H-s (KOR); W 2–1 ^{PP}	Chunayev (AZE); W 4–1 ^{PP}	Bye		Štefanek (SRB); L 1–1 ^{PP}	2nd place, silver medalist(s)
Arsen Julfalakyan	−75 kg	Aleksandrov (BUL); L 1–3 ^{PP}	Did not advance						13
Maksim Manukyan	−85 kg	V Lőrincz (HUN); L 0–3 ^{PO}	Did not advance						16
Artur Aleksanyan	−98 kg	Bye	Timoncini (ITA); W 3–1 ^{PP}	Alexuc-Ciurariu (ROU); W 8–0 ^{ST}	İldem (TUR); W 9–0 ^{ST}	Bye		Lugo (CUB); W 3–0 ^{PO}	1st place, gold medalist(s)
