= Batyr Akhmedov =

Russian boxer (born 1990)

Personal information
- Nationality: Russian
- Born: Botirjon Abdullaevich Akhmedov; 20 December 1990 (age 35) Oktyabr, Uzbekistan
- Height: 5 ft 7 1/2 in (171 cm)
- Weight: Light-welterweight; Welterweight

Boxing career
- Reach: 68 1/2 in (174 cm)
- Stance: Southpaw

Boxing record
- Total fights: 14
- Wins: 10
- Win by KO: 9
- Losses: 4

Botirjon Abdullaevich Akhmedov (Russian: Ботиржон Абдуллаевич Ахмедов; born 20 December 1990), better known as Batyr Akhmedov, and previously Batuhan Gözgeç, is a Russian professional boxer. He is a two-time super-lightweight world title challenger, having challenged for the WBA (Regular) title in 2019, and the WBA title in 2022. As an amateur he represented Turkey at the 2016 Olympics.

== Amateur career ==
He won the gold medal at the 2015 International Kadyrov Tournament held in Grozny, Chechen Republic, Russia.

Akhmedov earned a quota spot for 2016 Summer Olympics after taking the bronze medal at the 2016 European Boxing Olympic Qualification Tournament in Samsun, Turkey.

== Professional boxing career ==
Akhmedov made his professional debut on 23 February 2017, scoring a third-round technical knockout (TKO) over Dmitry Lavrinenko at the Forum in Nizhny Tagil, Russia.

After compiling a record of 7–0 (6 KOs) he faced Mario Barrios for the vacant WBA (Regular) super-lightweight title on 28 September 2019 at the Staples Center in Los Angeles, California. In a fight which saw Akhmedov have a knockdown scored against him after his gloves touched the canvas in the fourth round and a second knockdown in the twelfth and final round, Akhmedov lost via unanimous decision (UD), a decision which many described as controversial. Judge Jeremy Hayes scored the bout 116–111, judge Tim Cheatham scored it 115–111, and judge Zachary Young scored it 114–112.

Almost three years later, Akhmedov would challenge again for a vacant super-lightweight world title, this time the full WBA title against undefeated Alberto Puello on 20 August 2022. Puello won the fight by split decision. Two judges scored the fight 117–111 for Puello, while the third judge scored the fight 115–113.

== Professional boxing record ==
13 fights	10 wins	3 losses
By knockout	9	0
By decision	1	3

No.	Result	Record	Opponent	Type	Round, time	Date	Location	Notes
14	Loss	10–4	Oscar Duarte	UD	10	16 Nov 2024	The Venue Riyadh Season, Riyadh, Saudi Arabia	
13	Win	10–3	Mukhammadsalim Sotvoldiev	TKO	3 (8), 1:33	6 Nov 2023	Red Arena, Krasnaya Polyana, Sochi, Krasnodar Krai, Russia	
12	Loss	9–3	Kenneth Sims Jr.	MD	12	13 May 2023	Cosmopolitan of Las Vegas, Las Vegas, Nevada, US	
11	Loss	9–2	Alberto Puello	SD	12	20 Aug 2022	Seminole Hard Rock Hotel & Casino, Hollywood, Florida, US	For vacant WBA super-lightweight title
10	Win	9–1	Argenis Mendez	RTD	8 (12), 3:00	26 Jun 2021	State Farm Arena, Atlanta, Georgia, US	
9	Win	8–1	Rey Perez	KO	1 (10), 2:19	6 Sep 2020	Microsoft Theater, Los Angeles, California, US	
8	Loss	7–1	Mario Barrios	UD	12	28 Sep 2019	Staples Center, Los Angeles, California, US	For vacant WBA (Regular) super-lightweight title
7	Win	7–0	Francisco Gabriel Pina	RTD	5 (8), 3:00	25 May 2019	Gimnasio Oscar 'Tigre' García, Ensenada, Mexico	
6	Win	6–0	Viktor Plotnikov	RTD	6 (8), 3:00	30 Mar 2019	Ice Palace, Vladimir, Russia	
5	Win	5–0	Ismael Barroso	KO	9 (12), 1:06	18 Aug 2018	Westin Bonaventure Hotel, Los Angeles, California, US	Retained WBA Inter-Continental super-lightweight title
4	Win	4–0	Oscar Barajas	TKO	3 (8), 0:56	21 Apr 2018	Kings Theatre, New York City, New York, US	
3	Win	3–0	Ricky Sismundo	UD	10	17 Mar 2018	Floyd Mayweather Boxing Academy, Zhukovka, Russia	Won vacant WBA Inter-Continental super-lightweight title
2	Win	2–0	Levani Tsiklauri	TKO	2 (6), 1:27	9 Dec 2017	Evloev Sports Palace, Nazran, Russia	
1	Win	1–0	Dmitry Lavrinenko	TKO	3 (4), 2:18	23 Feb 2017	Forum, Nizhny Tagil, Russia	
