= Uladzislau Smiahlikau =

Belarusian boxer (born 1993)

Personal information
- Born: 5 April 1993 (age 33) Dobrush, Belarus

Sport
- Sport: Boxing
- Weight class: Heavyweight
Medal record
Men's amateur boxing
Representing Belarus
European Games
Silver medal – second place	2019 Minsk	Heavyweight

Uladzislau Viktaravich Smiahlikau (Belarusian: Уладзіслаў Віктаравіч Смяглікаў; born 5 April 1993) is a Belarusian amateur boxer. He won a silver medal at the 2019 European Games in the heavyweight division and reached the quarter-finals in the same weight category at the delayed 2020 Tokyo Olympics.
