= Turkey at the 2016 Summer Olympics =

- IOC code: TUR
- NOC: Turkish National Olympic Committee
- Website: olimpiyat.org.tr (in English and Turkish)

in Rio de Janeiro
- Competitors: 103 in 21 sports
- Flag bearers: Rıza Kayaalp (opening); Taha Akgul (closing)
- Medals Ranked 41st: Gold 1 Silver 3 Bronze 4 Total 8

Summer Olympics appearances (overview)
- 1908; 1912; 1920; 1924; 1928; 1932; 1936; 1948; 1952; 1956; 1960; 1964; 1968; 1972; 1976; 1980; 1984; 1988; 1992; 1996; 2000; 2004; 2008; 2012; 2016; 2020; 2024

Other related appearances
- 1906 Intercalated Games

Turkey competed at the 2016 Summer Olympics in Rio de Janeiro, Brazil, from 5 to 21 August 2016. Since the nation's debut in 1908, Turkish athletes have appeared in every edition of the Summer Olympic Games, except for three occasions. Turkey failed to register any athletes at the 1920 Summer Olympics in Antwerp, did not attend the 1932 Summer Olympics in Los Angeles during the worldwide Great Depression, and also joined the United States-led boycott, when Moscow hosted the 1980 Summer Olympics. The Turkish team consisted of 103 athletes, 55 men and 48 women, across twenty-one sports.

Turkey returned home from Rio de Janeiro with eight medals (one gold, three silver, and four bronze), a vast improvement on the nation's overall medal count from the 2012 Summer Olympics in London. Five of these medals were awarded to the wrestlers, including a sole golden glory from double world champion Taha Akgül in the men's super heavyweight freestyle (125 kg), and a runner-up feat from reigning world and multiple-time European champion Rıza Kayaalp in the Greco-Roman discipline, despite his failed attempt to avert a historic golden "three-peat" set forth by his Cuban rival Mijaín López.

Apart from the wrestlers, three Turkish athletes collected the rest of the country's medals in their respective individual sports. Among them were Cuban-born track sprinter Yasmani Copello in the men's 400 m hurdles, taekwondo fighter Nur Tatar in the women's welterweight division (67 kg), and Turkmen-born weightlifter Daniyar İsmayilov, who ended the country's momentary medal drought in his signature sport with a scintillating silver in the men's 69 kg category.

== Medalists ==
Medal	Name	Sport	Event	Date
Gold	Taha Akgül	Wrestling	Men's freestyle 125 kg	20 August
Silver	Daniyar Ismayilov	Weightlifting	Men's 69 kg	9 August
Silver	Rıza Kayaalp	Wrestling	Men's Greco-Roman 130 kg	15 August
Silver	Selim Yaşar	Wrestling	Men's freestyle 86 kg	20 August
Bronze	Cenk İldem	Wrestling	Men's Greco-Roman 98 kg	16 August
Bronze	Yasmani Copello	Athletics	Men's 400 m hurdles	18 August
Bronze	Soner Demirtaş	Wrestling	Men's freestyle 74 kg	19 August
Bronze	Nur Tatar	Taekwondo	Women's 67 kg	19 August

Medals by sport
Sport	1st place, gold medalist(s)	2nd place, silver medalist(s)	3rd place, bronze medalist(s)	Total
Wrestling	1	2	2	5
Weightlifting	0	1	0	1
Athletics	0	0	1	1
Taekwondo	0	0	1	1
Total	1	3	4	8

Medals by gender
Gender	1st place, gold medalist(s)	2nd place, silver medalist(s)	3rd place, bronze medalist(s)	Total
Male	1	3	3	7
Female	0	0	1	1
Total	1	3	4	8

== Competitors ==
The Turkish Olympic Committee (Turkish: Türkiye Milli Olimpiyat Komitesi, TMOK) fielded a roster of 103 athletes, 55 men and 48 women, to compete across twenty-one different sports at these Games; it was the nation's second-largest delegation sent to the Olympics, relatively smaller by eleven athletes than in London four years earlier. Women's basketball was the only collective sport in which Turkey qualified for the Games, having returned to the Olympic scene for the second straight time. These Games also witnessed several Turkish athletes compete for the first time in the women's modern pentathlon, as well as in equestrian jumping (1960) and fencing (1984) after long years of absence.

Track and field accounted for the most number of athletes on the Turkish team by an individual-based sport, with 31 entries (20 men and 11 women). There was only a single competitor each in badminton, sprint kayaking, equestrian jumping, fencing, modern pentathlon, and tennis.

The Turkish roster featured all three medalists returning from London 2012, namely taekwondo fighters Nur Tatar (women's 67 kg) and defending titleholder Servet Tazegül (men's 68 kg), and Greco-Roman wrestler Rıza Kayaalp, who entered his third straight Games as the reigning world champion, a multiple-time European champion, and a top medal favorite in the super heavyweight category. Because of his sporting successes, Kayaalp was nominated by TMOK to become the country's flag bearer in the opening ceremony.

Nearly a quarter of the Turkish athletes representing at these Games were born in the overseas, with several of them coming from Africa and former Soviet nations. Among the foreign-born athletes were track sprinters Jak Ali Harvey (Jamaica) and Ramil Guliyev (Azerbaijan), track hurdler Yasmani Copello (Cuba), breaststroke swimmer and four-time world junior champion Zeynep Güneş (Ukraine), three-time Olympians Melek Hu (table tennis player, China) and Karin Melis Mey (long jumper, South Africa), and world-ranked weightlifter Daniyar İsmayilov (Turkmenistan).

Other notable athletes on the Turkish squad included sailing brothers Ateş and Deniz Çınar in the men's 470 class, double world champion and top medal favorite Taha Akgül in the men's super heavyweight freestyle (125 kg), and hammer thrower and 2004 bronze medalist Eşref Apak, who headed the roster as the lone competitor going to his fourth straight Olympics. Seventeen-year-old gymnast Tutya Yılmaz was Turkey's youngest athlete of the Games, with pistol shooter and three-time Olympian Yusuf Dikeç rounding out the field as the oldest competitor (aged 43).

Sport	Men	Women	Total
Archery	1	1	2
Athletics	20	11	31
Badminton	0	1	1
Basketball	0	12	12
Boxing	6	0	6
Canoeing	0	1	1
Cycling	2	0	2
Equestrian	1	0	1
Fencing	0	1	1
Gymnastics	1	1	2
Judo	1	3	4
Modern pentathlon	0	1	1
Rowing	2	0	2
Sailing	4	2	6
Shooting	4	0	4
Swimming	1	3	4
Table tennis	1	1	2
Taekwondo	1	1	2
Tennis	0	1	1
Weightlifting	1	3	4
Wrestling	9	5	14
Total	55	48	103

== Archery ==
One Turkish archer has qualified each for the men's and women's individual recurve at the Olympics by securing one of three available Olympic spots at the 2016 European Championships in Nottingham, Great Britain.

Athlete	Event	Ranking round		Round of 64	Round of 32	Round of 16	Quarterfinals	Semifinals	Final / BM	
Athlete	Event	Score	Seed	Opposition Score	Opposition Score	Opposition Score	Opposition Score	Opposition Score	Opposition Score	Rank
Mete Gazoz	Men's individual	661	29	Plihon (FRA); W 6*–5	van den Berg (NED); L 3–7	Did not advance				
Yasemin Ecem Anagöz	Women's individual	638	25	Lipiarska-Pałka (POL); W 6*–5	Valencia (MEX); L 5–6*	Did not advance				

== Athletics ==
Turkish athletes have so far achieved qualifying standards in the following athletics events (up to a maximum of 3 athletes in each event):

Key

- Note–Ranks given for track events are within the athlete's heat only
- Q = Qualified for the next round
- q = Qualified for the next round as a fastest loser or, in field events, by position without achieving the qualifying target
- NR = National record
- N/A = Round not applicable for the event
- Bye = Athlete not required to compete in round

Track & road events
Men

Athlete	Event	Heat		Quarterfinal		Semifinal		Final	
Athlete	Event	Result	Rank	Result	Rank	Result	Rank	Result	Rank
Jak Ali Harvey	100 m	Bye		10.14	2 Q	10.03	4	Did not advance	
Jak Ali Harvey	200 m	20.58	6	—N/a		Did not advance			
Ramil Guliyev	200 m	20.23	2 Q	—N/a		20.09	4 q	20.43	8
İlham Tanui Özbilen	1500 m	3:49.02	13	—N/a		Did not advance			
Ali Kaya	5000 m	14:05.34	19	—N/a				Did not advance	
Ali Kaya	10000 m	—N/a						DNF	
Polat Kemboi Arıkan	10000 m	—N/a						27:35.50	13
Yasmani Copello	400 m hurdles	49.52	1 Q	—N/a		48.61	3 q	47.92	3rd place, bronze medalist(s)
Aras Kaya	3000 m steeplechase	8:32.35	8	—N/a				Did not advance	
Halil Akkaş	3000 m steeplechase	8:33.12	7	—N/a				Did not advance	
Tarık Langat Akdağ	3000 m steeplechase	DNF		—N/a				Did not advance	
Emre Zafer Barnes; Umutcan Cumali Emektaş; Jak Ali Harvey; Ramil Guliyev; İzzet Safer; Furkan Şen	4 × 100 m relay	38.30	4	—N/a				Did not advance	
Bekir Karayel	Marathon	—N/a						2:31:27	126
Ercan Muslu	Marathon	—N/a						2:18:40	51
Kaan Kigen Özbilen	Marathon	—N/a						2:14:11	17
Ersin Tacir	20 km walk	—N/a						1:22.53	30
Mert Atlı	20 km walk	—N/a						1:31.36	62

Women

Athlete	Event	Heat		Final	
Athlete	Event	Result	Rank	Result	Rank
Yasemin Can	5000 m	15:19.50	2 Q	14:56.96	6
Yasemin Can	10000 m	—N/a		30:26.41	7
Meryem Akda	3000 m steeplechase	9:50.28	14	Did not advance	
Özlem Kaya	3000 m steeplechase	9:32.03	9	Did not advance	
Tuğba Güvenç	3000 m steeplechase	9:49.93	14	Did not advance	
Esma Aydemir	Marathon	—N/a		2:39.59	58
Sultan Haydar	Marathon	—N/a		2:53.57	111
Meryem Erdoğan	Marathon	—N/a		2:54.04	112

Field events

Athlete	Event	Qualification		Final	
Athlete	Event	Distance	Position	Distance	Position
Şeref Osmanoğlu	Men's triple jump	NM	—	Did not advance	
Eşref Apak	Men's hammer throw	70.08	15	Did not advance	
Karin Melis Mey	Women's long jump	6.49	14	Did not advance	
Emel Dereli	Women's shot put	17.01	24	Did not advance	
Kıvılcım Kaya	Women's hammer throw	64.79	26	Did not advance	
Tuğçe Şahutoğlu	Women's hammer throw	67.05	21	Did not advance	

== Badminton ==
Turkey has qualified one badminton player for the women's singles into the Olympic tournament. Özge Bayrak had claimed her Olympic spot as one of top 34 individual shuttlers in the BWF World Rankings as of 5 May 2016.

Athlete	Event	Group stage			Elimination	Quarterfinal	Semifinal	Final / BM	
Athlete	Event	Opposition Score	Opposition Score	Rank	Opposition Score	Opposition Score	Opposition Score	Opposition Score	Rank
Özge Bayrak	Women's singles	Cicognini (ITA); W (21–14, 21–9)	Bae Y-j (KOR); L (11–21, 7–21)	2	Did not advance				

== Basketball ==
=== Women's tournament ===
Turkey women's basketball team qualified for the Olympics with a quarterfinal victory at the 2016 FIBA World Olympic Qualifying Tournament in Nantes, France.

Team roster

The following is the Turkey roster in the women's basketball tournament of the 2016 Summer Olympics.

Turkey women's national basketball team – 2016 Summer Olympics roster
Players
Coaches

Pos.	No.	Name	Age – Date of birth	Height	Club	Ctr.
PG	4	Olcay Çakır	23 – 13 July 1993	1.82 m (6 ft 0 in)	Fenerbahçe	(Turkey)
PF	5	Tuğçe Canıtez	25 – 10 November 1990	1.88 m (6 ft 2 in)	Fenerbahçe	(Turkey)
PG	7	Birsel Vardarlı	32 – 12 July 1984	1.75 m (5 ft 9 in)	Fenerbahçe	(Turkey)
C	8	Esra Ural	24 – 18 August 1991	1.98 m (6 ft 6 in)	Abdullah Gül	(Turkey)
PF	9	Bahar Çağlar	27 – 28 September 1988	1.90 m (6 ft 3 in)	Galatasaray	(Turkey)
PG	10	Işıl Alben	30 – 22 February 1986	1.72 m (5 ft 8 in)	Galatasaray	(Turkey)
C	11	Nevriye Yılmaz	36 – 16 June 1980	1.92 m (6 ft 4 in)	Galatasaray	(Turkey)
C	12	LaToya Sanders	29 – 11 September 1986	1.91 m (6 ft 3 in)	Abdullah Gül	(Turkey)
SG	13	Ayşe Cora	23 – 3 March 1993	1.75 m (5 ft 9 in)	Beşiktaş	(Turkey)
F	14	Şaziye İvegin	34 – 8 February 1982	1.80 m (5 ft 11 in)	Beşiktaş	(Turkey)
PF	15	Tilbe Şenyürek	21 – 26 April 1995	1.89 m (6 ft 2 in)	Botaşspor	(Turkey)
PF	33	Şebnem Kimyacıoğlu	33 – 14 June 1983	1.82 m (6 ft 0 in)	Yakın Doğu	(Turkey)

Head coach

- (Turkey) Ekrem Memnun

Assistant coach(es)

- (Turkey) Aziz Akkaya
- (Turkey) Murat Bilge

Legend

- (C) Team captain
- Club – describes last
  club before the tournament
- Age – describes age
  on 6 August 2016

Group play

Pos	Team	Pld	W	L	PF	PA	PD	Pts	Qualification
1	Australia	5	5	0	400	345	+55	10	Quarter-finals
2	France	5	3	2	344	343	+1	8 (Note: Head-to-head record: France 3 pts, +8 PD; Turkey 3 pts, −2 PD; Japan 3 pts, −6 PD)	Quarter-finals
3	Turkey	5	3	2	324	325	−1	8	Quarter-finals
4	Japan	5	3	2	386	378	+8	8	Quarter-finals
5	Belarus	5	1	4	347	361	−14	6	
6	Brazil (H)	5	0	5	335	384	−49	5	

Source: FIBA
Rules for classification: 1) points; 2) head-to-head points; 3) head-to-head points difference; 4) head-to-head number of points scored.
(H) Hosts
Notes:

6 August 2016
12:00

Boxscore

Turkey	39–55	France
Scoring by quarter: 16–8, 3–14, 16–19, 4–14
Pts: Yılmaz 16; Rebs: Yılmaz 6 Asts: Vardarlı 5		Pts: Michel, Miyem 14; Rebs: Yacoubou 11; Asts: Epoupa 5

Youth Arena, Rio de Janeiro
Attendance: 2,042
Referees: Guilherme Locatelli (BRA), Scott Beker (AUS), Natalia Cuello (DOM)

7 August 2016
17:30

Boxscore

Australia	61–56	Turkey
Scoring by quarter: 12–15, 14–14, 17–12, 18–15
Pts: Cambage 22; Rebs: Cambage 11; Asts: three players 3		Pts: Sanders 25; Rebs: Sanders 7 Asts: Vardarlı 7

Youth Arena, Rio de Janeiro
Attendance: 1,853
Referees: Anne Panther (GER), Leandro Lezcano (ARG), Carlos Peruga (ESP)

9 August 2016
17:45

Boxscore

Turkey	76–62	Japan
Scoring by quarter: 24–9, 14–14, 19–16, 19–23
Pts: Sanders 36; Rebs: Çağlar 9 Asts: Alben, Çakır 5		Pts: Tokashiki 13; Rebs: Tokashiki 7 Asts: Yoshida 7

Youth Arena, Rio de Janeiro
Attendance: 2,624
Referees: Oļegs Latiševs (LAT), Ferdinand Pascual (PHI), Chanihaz Boussetta (MAR)

11 August 2016
12:15

Boxscore

Belarus	71–74	Turkey
Scoring by quarter: 19–13, 14–20, 21–24, 17–17
Pts: Harding 17; Rebs: Leuchanka 10; Asts: Verameyenka 7		Pts: Yılmaz 26; Rebs: Sanders 11; Asts: Vardarlı 7

Youth Arena, Rio de Janeiro
Attendance: 1,784
Referees: Carlos Peruga (ESP), Hwang In-tae (KOR), Carlos Júlio (ANG)

13 August 2016
15:30

Boxscore

Turkey	79–76 (2OT)	Brazil
Scoring by quarter: 8–15, 12–21, 21–11, 19–13, Overtime: 10–10, 9–6
Pts: Sanders 23; Rebs: Sanders 10; Asts: Alben 5		Pts: Castro 22; Rebs: Dos Santos 12; Asts: Castro 8

Youth Arena, Rio de Janeiro
Attendance: 3,075
Referees: Juan Carlos García (ESP), Hwang In-tae (KOR), Piotr Pastusiak (POL)

Quarter-final

16 August 2016
14:30

Boxscore

Spain	64–62	Turkey
Scoring by quarter: 12–17, 17–8, 13–22, 22–15
Pts: Cruz 14; Rebs: Torrens 11; Asts: Cruz 6		Pts: Sanders 22; Rebs: Sanders 10; Asts: Alben 6

Carioca Arena 1, Rio de Janeiro
Attendance: 6,565
Referees: Cristiano Maranho (BRA), Anne Panther (GER), Leandro Lezcano (ARG)

== Boxing ==
Turkey has entered five boxers to compete in the following weight classes into the Olympic boxing tournament. Onur Şipal became the first Turkish boxer to be selected to the Olympic team with a top two finish of his respective weight division in the AIBA Pro Boxing series. Meanwhile, three further boxers (Gozgec, Ünal, and Demirezen) had claimed their Olympic spots with box-off victories at the 2016 European Qualification Tournament in Samsun.

London 2012 Olympian Selçuk Eker secured an additional Olympic place on the Turkish roster at the 2016 AIBA World Qualifying Tournament in Baku, Azerbaijan, while Şipal's younger brother Önder completed the boxing lineup with his box-off triumph at the 2016 APB and WSB Olympic Qualifier in Vargas, Venezuela.

Athlete	Event	Round of 32	Round of 16	Quarterfinals	Semifinals	Final	
Athlete	Event	Opposition Result	Opposition Result	Opposition Result	Opposition Result	Opposition Result	Rank
Selçuk Eker	Men's flyweight	Hu Jg (CHN); L 1–2	Did not advance				
Batuhan Gözgeç	Men's light welterweight	Smaila (CMR); W 3–0	Teixeira (BRA); W 3–0	Harutyunyan (GER); L 0–3	Did not advance		
Onur Şipal	Men's welterweight	Chamov (BUL); L 0–3	Did not advance				
Önder Şipal	Men's middleweight	Muziyo (ZAM); W 2–1	Yadav (IND); L 0–3	Did not advance			
Mehmet Nadir Ünal	Men's light heavyweight	Saada (MAR); W WO	La Cruz (CUB); L 0–3	Did not advance			
Ali Eren Demirezen	Men's super heavyweight	Bye	Hrgović (CRO); L 0–3	Did not advance			

== Canoeing ==
=== Sprint ===
Turkish canoeists have qualified one boat in each of the following events through the 2015 ICF Canoe Sprint World Championships.

Athlete	Event	Heats		Semifinals		Final	
Athlete	Event	Time	Rank	Time	Rank	Time	Rank
Lasma Liepa	Women's K-1 200 m	41.760	4 Q	41.866	7	Did not advance	
Lasma Liepa	Women's K-1 500 m	1:59.581	5 Q	2:08.450	7	Did not advance	

Qualification Legend: FA = Qualify to final (medal); FB = Qualify to final B (non-medal)

== Cycling ==
=== Road ===
Turkish riders qualified for a maximum of two quota places in the men's Olympic road race by virtue of their top 15 final national ranking in the 2015 UCI Europe Tour.

Athlete	Event	Time	Rank
Onur Balkan	Men's road race	Did not finish	
Ahmet Örken	Men's road race	Did not finish	
Ahmet Örken	Men's time trial	1:27:37.41	34

== Equestrian ==
Turkey has entered one jumping rider into the Olympic equestrian competition by virtue of a top national finish from Central & Eastern Europe in the individual FEI Olympic Rankings. This signified the nation's Olympic return to the sport for the first time since 1960.

=== Jumping ===
Athlete	Horse	Event	Qualification								Final					Total	
Athlete	Horse	Event	Round 1		Round 2			Round 3			Round A		Round B			Total	
Athlete	Horse	Event	Penalties	Rank	Penalties	Total	Rank	Penalties	Total	Rank	Penalties	Rank	Penalties	Total	Rank	Penalties	Rank
Ömer Karaevli	Roso au Crosnier	Individual	13	61	Did not advance												

== Fencing ==
Turkey has entered one fencer into the Olympic competition, signifying the nation's sporting comeback for the first time since 1984. İrem Karamete had claimed her Olympic spot in the women's foil by finishing among the top four individuals at the European Zonal Qualifier in Prague, Czech Republic.

Athlete	Event	Round of 64	Round of 32	Round of 16	Quarterfinal	Semifinal	Final / BM	
Athlete	Event	Opposition Score	Opposition Score	Opposition Score	Opposition Score	Opposition Score	Opposition Score	Rank
İrem Karamete	Women's foil	Bye	Thibus (FRA); L 6–15	Did not advance				

== Gymnastics ==
=== Artistic ===
Turkey has entered two artistic gymnasts into the Olympic competition. Ferhat Arican and Tutya Yılmaz had claimed their Olympic spots each in the men's and women's apparatus and all-around events, respectively, at the Olympic Test Event in Rio de Janeiro.

Men

Athlete	Event	Qualification								Final							
Athlete	Event	Apparatus						Total	Rank	Apparatus						Total	Rank
Athlete	Event	F	PH	R	V	PB	HB	Total	Rank	F	PH	R	V	PB	HB	Total	Rank
Ferhat Arican	All-around	13.133	13.866	13.733	13.533	14.733	13.633	82.631	41	Did not advance							

Women

Athlete	Event	Qualification						Final					
Athlete	Event	Apparatus				Total	Rank	Apparatus				Total	Rank
Athlete	Event	V	UB	BB	F	Total	Rank	V	UB	BB	F	Total	Rank
Tutya Yılmaz	All-around	13.733	12.166	14.500	12.733	53.132	42	Did not advance					

== Judo ==
Turkey has qualified a total of four judokas for the following weight classes at the Games. London 2012 Olympian Bekir Özlü (previously competed for Georgia), Dilara Lokmanhekim, and Kayra Sayit were ranked among the top 22 eligible judokas for men and top 14 for women in the IJF World Ranking List of May 30, 2016, while Büşra Katipoğlu at women's half-middleweight (63 kg) earned a continental quota spot from the European region, as the highest-ranked Turkish judoka outside of direct qualifying position.

Athlete	Event	Round of 64	Round of 32	Round of 16	Quarterfinals	Semifinals	Repechage	Final / BM	
Athlete	Event	Opposition Result	Opposition Result	Opposition Result	Opposition Result	Opposition Result	Opposition Result	Opposition Result	Rank
Bekir Özlü	Men's −60 kg	Bye	McKenzie (GBR); L 000–003	Did not advance					
Dilara Lokmanhekim	Women's −48 kg	—N/a	Carrillo (MEX); L 000–100	Did not advance					
Büşra Katipoğlu	Women's −63 kg	—N/a	Nikoloska (MKD); W 000–000 S	Agbegnenou (FRA); L 000–102	Did not advance				
Kayra Sayit	Women's +78 kg	—N/a	Bye	Mojica (PUR); W 102–000	Yu S (CHN); L 000–111	Did not advance	Chikhrouhou (TUN); W 100–000	Yamabe (JPN); L 000–010	5

== Modern pentathlon ==
Turkey has received an invitation from UIPM to send İlke Özyüksel in the women's modern pentathlon to the Olympics for the first time, as one of the next highest-ranked individuals, not yet qualified, in the World Rankings as of June 1, 2016.

Athlete	Event	Fencing (épée one touch)				Swimming (200 m freestyle)			Riding (show jumping)			Combined: shooting/running (10 m air pistol)/(3200 m)			Total points	Final rank
Athlete	Event	RR	BR	Rank	MP points	Time	Rank	MP points	Penalties	Rank	MP points	Time	Rank	MP points	Total points	Final rank
İlke Özyüksel	Women's	10–25	0	35	160	2:17.79	19	287	EL	=31	0	12:49.98	12	531	978	35

== Rowing ==
Turkey has qualified one boat in the men's lightweight double sculls for the Olympics by virtue of a top two finish at the 2016 European & Final Qualification Regatta in Lucerne, Switzerland.

Athlete	Event	Heats		Repechage		Semifinals		Final	
Athlete	Event	Time	Rank	Time	Rank	Time	Rank	Time	Rank
Hüseyin Kandemir; Cem Yılmaz	Men's lightweight double sculls	6:41.67	5 R	7:13.49	5 SC/D	7:24.14	2 FC	6:47.06	16

Qualification Legend: FA=Final A (medal); FB=Final B (non-medal); FC=Final C (non-medal); FD=Final D (non-medal); FE=Final E (non-medal); FF=Final F (non-medal); SA/B=Semifinals A/B; SC/D=Semifinals C/D; SE/F=Semifinals E/F; QF=Quarterfinals; R=Repechage

== Sailing ==
Turkish sailors have qualified one boat in each of the following classes through the individual fleet World Championships, and European qualifying regattas.

London 2012 Olympians Alican Kaynar, Nazlı Çağla Dönertaş, and brothers Ateş Çınar and Deniz Çınar were selected to the Olympic roster under the qualifying merit. Windsurfers Dilara Uralp and Onur Cavit Biriz were added to Turkey's sailing lineup for the Games on June 24, 2016, after the nation received spare Olympic berths freed up by New Zealand and Canada, respectively, from the International Sailing Federation.

Athlete	Event	Race													Net points	Final rank
Athlete	Event	1	2	3	4	5	6	7	8	9	10	11	12	M*	Net points	Final rank
Onur Cavit Biriz	Men's RS:X	31	32	~~37~~	34	37	29	23	37	33	37	33	37	EL	363	35
Alican Kaynar	Men's Finn	2	5	6	~~19~~	19	12	8	17	12	11	—N/a		EL	93	13
Ateş Çınar; Deniz Çınar	Men's 470	14	19	18	12	7	15	12	18	~~21~~	5	—N/a		EL	120	15
Dilara Uralp	Women's RS:X	20	19	23	24	20	21	~~27~~	21	20	20	24	19	EL	231	22
Nazlı Çağla Dönertaş	Women's Laser Radial	16	20	6	9	22	10	5	27	12	~~28~~	—N/a		EL	127	15

M = Medal race; EL = Eliminated – did not advance into the medal race

== Shooting ==
Turkish shooters have achieved quota places for the following events by virtue of their best finishes at the 2014 and 2015 ISSF World Championships, the 2015 ISSF World Cup series, and European Championships or Games, as long as they obtained a minimum qualifying score (MQS) by March 31, 2016.

Athlete	Event	Qualification		Semifinal		Final	
Athlete	Event	Points	Rank	Points	Rank	Points	Rank
Yusuf Dikeç	Men's 10 m air pistol	576	21	—N/a		Did not advance	
Yusuf Dikeç	Men's 50 m pistol	550	22	—N/a		Did not advance	
Yavuz İlnam	Men's trap	115	13	Did not advance			
Erdinç Kebapçı	Men's trap	108	29	Did not advance			
İsmail Keleş	Men's 10 m air pistol	575	24	—N/a		Did not advance	
İsmail Keleş	Men's 50 m pistol	544	29	—N/a		Did not advance	

Qualification Legend: Q = Qualify for the next round; q = Qualify for the bronze medal (shotgun)

== Swimming ==
Turkish swimmers have so far achieved qualifying standards in the following events (up to a maximum of 2 swimmers in each event at the Olympic Qualifying Time (OQT), and potentially 1 at the Olympic Selection Time (OST)):

Athlete	Event	Heat		Semifinal		Final	
Athlete	Event	Time	Rank	Time	Rank	Time	Rank
Nezir Karap	Men's 400 m freestyle	3:58.37	43	—N/a		Did not advance	
Ekaterina Avramova	Women's 200 m backstroke	2:11.21	21	Did not advance			
Zeynep Güneş	Women's 100 m breaststroke	1:07.14	15 Q	1:07.41	14	Did not advance	
Zeynep Güneş	Women's 200 m breaststroke	2:23.83	7 Q	2:23.49	9	Did not advance	
Zeynep Güneş	Women's 400 m individual medley	4:41.79	18	—N/a		Did not advance	
Nida Eliz Üstündağ	Women's 200 m butterfly	2:10.02	22	Did not advance			

== Table tennis ==
Turkey has entered one athlete into the table tennis competition at the Games. Two-time Olympian Melek Hu secured one of ten available Olympic spots in the women's singles by winning the group final match at the European Qualification Tournament in Halmstad, Sweden. Meanwhile, Ahmet Li was automatically selected among the top 22 eligible players in the men's singles based on the ITTF Olympic Rankings.

Athlete	Event	Preliminary	Round 1	Round 2	Round 3	Round of 16	Quarterfinals	Semifinals	Final / BM	
Athlete	Event	Opposition Result	Opposition Result	Opposition Result	Opposition Result	Opposition Result	Opposition Result	Opposition Result	Opposition Result	Rank
Ahmet Li	Men's singles	Bye		Wang (CAN); L 0–4	Did not advance					
Melek Hu	Women's singles	Bye			Chen S-y (TPE); L 0–4	Did not advance				

== Taekwondo ==
Turkey entered two athletes into the taekwondo competition at the Olympics. 2012 Olympic featherweight champion Servet Tazegül and silver medalist Nur Tatar qualified automatically for their respective weight classes by finishing in the top 6 WTF Olympic rankings.

Athlete	Event	Round of 16	Quarterfinals	Semifinals	Repechage	Final / BM	
Athlete	Event	Opposition Result	Opposition Result	Opposition Result	Opposition Result	Opposition Result	Rank
Servet Tazegül	Men's −68 kg	Morales (CHI); W 14–1 PTG	Denisenko (RUS); L 6–19 PTG	Did not advance	Contreras (VEN); L 4–5	Did not advance	7
Nur Tatar	Women's −67 kg	Marton (AUS); W 11–1	Gülec (GER); W 5–1	Niaré (FRA); L 0–4 SUD	Bye	Chuang C-c (TPE); W 7–3	3rd place, bronze medalist(s)

== Tennis ==
Turkey has entered one tennis player into the Olympic tournament. Due to the withdrawal of several tennis players from the Games, Çağla Büyükakçay (world no. 77) received a spare ITF Olympic place to compete in the women's singles, as the next highest-ranked eligible player, not yet qualified, in the WTA World Rankings as of June 6, 2016.

Athlete	Event	Round of 64	Round of 32	Round of 16	Quarterfinals	Semifinals	Final / BM	
Athlete	Event	Opposition Score	Opposition Score	Opposition Score	Opposition Score	Opposition Score	Opposition Score	Rank
Çağla Büyükakçay	Women's singles	Makarova (RUS); L 6–3, 0–6, 6–8	Did not advance					

== Weightlifting ==
Turkish weightlifters have qualified three women's quota places for the Rio Olympics based on their combined team standing by points at the 2014 and 2015 IWF World Championships. A single men's Olympic spot had been added to the Turkish roster by virtue of a top seven national finish at the 2016 European Championships. The team must allocate these places to individual athletes by June 20, 2016.

Athlete	Event	Snatch		Clean & jerk		Total	Rank
Athlete	Event	Result	Rank	Result	Rank	Total	Rank
Daniyar Ismayilov	Men's −69 kg	163	1	188	2	351	2nd place, silver medalist(s)
Mehtap Kurnaz	Women's −63 kg	81	14	100	13	181	13
Duygu Aynacı	Women's −69 kg	90	14	110	12	200	12
Assiya Ipek	Women's −75 kg	83	13	103	13	186	13

== Wrestling ==
Turkey has qualified a total of fourteen wrestlers for each of the following weight classes into the Olympic competition. Four of them finished among the top six to book Olympic spots in the men's freestyle (86 & 125 kg), men's Greco-Roman 130 kg, and women's freestyle 58 kg at the 2015 World Championships, while three additional licenses were awarded to Turkish wrestlers, who progressed to the top two finals at the 2016 European Qualification Tournament.

The remaining half of the Turkish roster secured their Olympic places to complete the wrestling line-up in separate World Qualification Tournaments; three of them at the initial meet in Ulaanbaatar and four more at the final meet in Istanbul.

Athlete	Event	Qualification	Round of 16	Quarterfinal	Semifinal	Repechage 1	Repechage 2	Final / BM	
Athlete	Event	Opposition Result	Opposition Result	Opposition Result	Opposition Result	Opposition Result	Opposition Result	Opposition Result	Rank
Men's Freestyle
Süleyman Atlı	−57 kg	Bye	Guidea (ROU); L 3–8	Did not advance					16
Mustafa Kaya	−65 kg	Valdés (CUB); L 4–4 ^{F}	Did not advance						20
Soner Demirtaş	−74 kg	Bye	Pürevjav (MGL); W 4–2	Yazdani (IRI); L 0–7	Did not advance	Bye	Castelly (HAI); W 12–0	Usserbayev (KAZ); W 6–0	3rd place, bronze medalist(s)
Selim Yaşar	−86 kg	Bye	Espinal (PUR); W 5–2	Salas (CUB); W 5–2	Cox (USA); W 2–1	Bye		Sadulaev (RUS); L 0–5	2nd place, silver medalist(s)
İbrahim Bölükbaşı	−97 kg	R Yazdani (IRI); L 0–10	Did not advance						17
Taha Akgül	−125 kg	Bye	Jargalsaikhan (MGL); W 10–0	Saidau (BLR); W 11–0	Berianidze (ARM); W 8–1	Bye		Ghasemi (IRI); W 3–1	1st place, gold medalist(s)
Men's Greco-Roman
Selçuk Çebi	−75 kg	Bye	Starčević (CRO); L 1–2	Did not advance					15
Cenk İldem	−98 kg	Bye	Singh (IND); W 2–1	Magomedov (RUS); W 1–1	Aleksanyan (ARM); L 0–9	Bye		Alexuc-Ciurariu (ROU); W 4–0	3rd place, bronze medalist(s)
Rıza Kayaalp	−130 kg	Bye	Caraballo (VEN); W 8–0	Shariati (AZE); W 5–0 ^{F}	Popp (GER); W 8–0	Bye		López (CUB); L 0–6	2nd place, silver medalist(s)
Women's Freestyle
Bediha Gün	−53 kg	Bye	Jong M-s (PRK); L 0–10	Did not advance					18
Elif Jale Yeşilırmak	−58 kg	Bye	Fazzari (CAN); W 3–1	Icho (JPN); L 1–3	Did not advance	Bye	Amri (TUN); L 2–3	Did not advance	9
Hafize Şahin	−63 kg	Nunes (BRA); W 2–5 ^{F}	Trazhukova (RUS); L 5–9	Did not advance					8
Buse Tosun	−69 kg	Wieszczek (POL); W 6–0 ^{F}	Dosho (JPN); L 0–12	Did not advance		Stadnyk (UKR); W 7–4	Yeats (CAN); L 2–3	Did not advance	7
Yasemin Adar	−75 kg	Cherkasova (UKR); W 12–10	Bukina (RUS); L 3–5	Did not advance					8

== See also ==
- Turkey at the 2016 Summer Paralympics
