= 2013 European Amateur Boxing Championships =

Boxing competitions

The Men's 2013 European Amateur Boxing Championships were held in Minsk, Belarus from June 1 to June 8, 2013. It is the 40th edition of this biennial competition organised by the European governing body for amateur boxing, the EUBC.

37 countries, 208 sportsmen took part in the competition.

The organization of this championships cost 11 billion Br (Belarusian currency, 1 mln. Eu) for the Belarusian government.

== Schedule ==
From 1 June–3 June the preliminaries were held, on June 4–05 the quarterfinals in all categories were held. The semifinals took place on June 7 with the finals at June 08.

== Medal winners ==
Event	Gold	Silver	Bronze
Light Flyweight (–49 kg)	David Ayrapetyan (RUS)	Patrick Barnes (IRL)	Salman Alizade (AZE) Jack Bateson (ENG)
Flyweight (–52 kg)	Andrew Selby (WAL)	Michael Conlan (IRL)	Elvin Mamishzade (AZE) Ovik Ogannisian (RUS)
Bantamweight (–56 kg)	John Joe Nevin (IRL)	Mykola Butsenko (UKR)	Aram Avagyan (ARM) Vladimir Nikitin (RUS)
Lightweight (–60 kg)	Pavlo Ishchenko (UKR)	Vazgen Safaryants (BLR)	Dmitry Polyanskiy (RUS) Miklos Varga (HUN)
Light Welterweight (–64 kg)	Armen Zakaryan (RUS)	Dmitri Galagoț (MDA)	Artem Harutyunyan (GER) Abdelmalik Ladjali (FRA)
Welterweight (–69 kg)	Alexander Besputin (RUS)	Arajik Marutjan (GER)	Pavel Kastramin (BLR) Bogdan Shelestyuk (UKR)
Middleweight (–75 kg)	Jason Quigley (IRL)	Anars Mursudovs (LAT)	Zoltán Harcsa (HUN) Ievgen Khytrov (UKR)
Light Heavyweight (–81 kg)	Nikita Ivanov (RUS)	Peter Mullenberg (NED)	Petru Ciobanu (MDA) Siarhei Novikau (BLR)
Heavyweight (–91 kg)	Alexey Egorov (RUS)	Teymur Mammadov (AZE)	Emir Ahmatovic (GER) Denys Poyatsyka (UKR)
Super Heavyweight (+91 kg)	Magomedrasul Medzhidov (AZE)	Sergey Kuzmin (RUS)	Joseph Joyce (ENG) Viktar Zuyeu (BLR)

=== Medal table ===
Rank	Nation	Gold	Silver	Bronze	Total
1	Russia	5	1	3	9
2	Ireland	2	2	0	4
3	Ukraine	1	1	3	5
4	Azerbaijan	1	1	2	4
5	Wales	1	0	0	1
6	Belarus	0	1	3	4
7	Germany	0	1	2	3
8	Moldova	0	1	1	2
9	Latvia	0	1	0	1
9	Netherlands	0	1	0	1
11	England	0	0	2	2
11	Hungary	0	0	2	2
13	Armenia	0	0	1	1
13	France	0	0	1	1
Totals (14 entries)		10	10	20	40
