= Cyrus Ramone Pattinson =

English boxer (born 1994)

Cyrus Pattinson
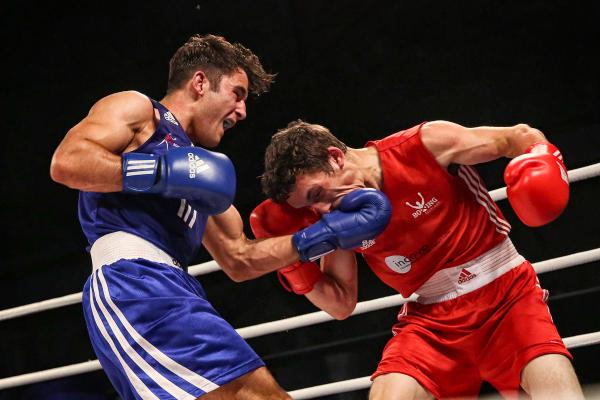

Personal information
- Nationality: British
- Born: Cyrus Ramone Pattinson; 6 April 1994 (age 32) Ashington, Northumberland, England
- Height: 1.79 m (5 ft 10 1/2 in)
- Weight: Welterweight

Boxing career
- Stance: Southpaw
Medal record
Men's amateur boxing
Representing Great Britain
Bocskai
Bronze medal – third place	2018 Hungary	Welterweight
Silver medal – second place	2016 Hungary	Welterweight
Representing England
Tammer Tournament
Gold medal – first place	2017 Tampere	Welterweight
Feliks Stamm
Gold medal – first place	2016 Warsaw	Welterweight
GB Championships
Gold medal – first place	2015 Sheffield	Welterweight
Tri Nation Championships
Gold medal – first place	2015 Sheffield	Welterweight
ABA Championships
Silver medal – second place	2015 Liverpool	Welterweight

Cyrus Ramone Pattinson (born 6 April 1994) is a British professional boxer and was an amateur boxer for Great Britain and Birtley ABC.

== Personal life ==
Born in Ashington, Pattinson was raised on various council estates in a Northumberland town, Alnwick. Educated at The Duchess's High School, he left to complete a Boxing Scholarship at Gateshead College, focusing solely on boxing.

=== Amateur highlights ===
2012 Junior ABA Championships as a Welterweight 70 kg (England)

- Lost to Dan Woledge (St. Marys) 39-20 - Final

2015 Elite ABA Championships as a Welterweight 69 kg (England)

- Defeated Stuart Buckley 3-0
- Defeated James Downs RSC2
- Defeated Garry Dodds 3-0
- Defeated Jack Raffety 3-0
- Defeated Scott Fitzgerald (boxer) 3-0
- Lost to Conor Loftus 3-0 - Final

2015 Elite Tri Nation Championships as a Welterweight 69 kg (England)

- Defeated Kieran Gethin (Wales) 3-0
- Defeated Dennis Broadhurst (Scotland) 3-0 - Final

2015 Elite GB Championships as a Welterweight 69 kg (England)

- Defeated Conor Loftus 3-0

2016 Bocskai Tournament as a Welterweight 69 kg (Hungary)

- Defeated Viktor Agateljan (Czech) 3-0 - Quarter Final
- Defeated Souleymane Cissokho (France) 3-0 - Semi Final
- Forced to Withdraw Arajik Marutjan (Germany) W.O - Final

2016 European Olympic Qualifier as a Welterweight 69 kg (Turkey)

- Defeated Muhammad Abdilrasoon (Finland) 3-0
- Defeated Arajik Marutjan (Germany) 3-0
- Lost to Vladimir Margaryan (Armenia) 3-0

2016 Feliks Stamm Memorial Tournament as a Welterweight 69 kg (Poland)

- Defeated Damien Kiwio (Poland) 3-0
- Defeated Zdeněk Chládek (Czech) 2-1

2018 Bocskai Tournament as a Welterweight 69 kg (Hungary)

- Lost to Yaroslav Samofalov (Ukraine) 3-2

2017 Tammer Tournament as a Welterweight 69 kg (Finland)

- Defeated Saimonas Banys (Lithuania) 5-0 - Semi Final
- Defeated Kieran Molloy (Ireland) RSC1 - Final

2018 Bocskai Tournament as a Welterweight 69 kg (Hungary)

- Defeated Kálmán Hankó (Hungary) 4-1
- Defeated Kamil Holka (Poland) 5-0 - Quarter Final
- Lost to András Vadász (Hungary) 3-2 - Semi Final

2019 Livenstev Tournament as a Welterweight 69 kg (Belgium)

- Lost to Gurgen Madoyan (Armenia) 5-0

2020 Bocskai Tournament as a Welterweight 69 kg (Hungary)

- Defeated Mmusie Tswiige (Botswana) 4-1 - Preliminaries
- Defeated Don Emini (Norway) 5-0 - Pre Quarter Final
- Lost to Wahid Hambli (France) 3-2 - Quarter Final
