= István Bernáth =

Hungarian boxer (born 1989)

Personal information
- Nationality: Hungarian
- Born: 28 January 1989 (age 37) Budapest, Hungary
- Height: 193 cm (6 ft 4 in)

Boxing career
- Weight class: Super-heavyweight
- Stance: Orthodox

Boxing record
- Total fights: 12
- Wins: 10
- Win by KO: 8
- Losses: 2
Medal record
Men's amateur boxing
Representing Hungary
EU Championships
| Silver medal – second place | 2008 Cetniewo | Super-heavyweight |
| Silver medal – second place | 2009 Odense | Super-heavyweight |

István Bernáth (born 28 January 1989) is a Hungarian professional boxer. As an amateur, he won a silver medal in the super-heavyweight division at the 2008 EU Championships and at the 2009 EU Championships.

In 2021 Bernath started his professional career.

== Amateur career ==
=== International highlights ===
(silver) 2008 – EUBC European Union Championships (Cetniewo, Poland) 2nd place – +91 kg

- Finals: Lost to David Price (England)

(silver) 2009 – EUBC European Union Championships (Odense, Denmark) 2nd place – +91 kg

- Finals: Lost to John Jones (Wales)

2010 – European Amateur Boxing Championships (Moscow, Russia) 5th place – +91 kg

- 1/4: Lost to Viktar Zuyev (Belarus) 2:10

2011 – European Amateur Boxing Championships (Ankara, Turkey) 5th place – +91 kg

- 1/4: Lost to Roberto Cammarelle (Italy) 6:18

2012 – AIBA European Olympic Qualification Tournament (Trabzon, Turkey) 4th place – +91 kg

- 1/8: Defeated Roman Marynovski (Israel) 16:9
- 1/4: Defeated Labinot Xhoxhaj (Slovenia) 14:4
- 1/2: Lost to Tony Yoka (France) 2:12

2013 – AIBA World Boxing Championships (Almaty, Kazakhstan) 7th place – +91 kg

- 1/16: Defeated Alen Beganović (Montenegro) TKO
- 1/8: Lost to Ivan Dychko (Kazakhstan) 0:3

2015 – European Games (Baku, Azerbaijan) 7th place – +91 kg

- 1/16: Defeated Petar Belberov (Bulgaria) 3:0
- 1/8: Lost to Tony Yoka (France) 0:3

2016 – AIBA European Olympic Qualification Tournament (Samsun, Turkey) 4th place – +91 kg

- 1/8: Defeated Tim Jevscek (Slovenia) TKO
- 1/4: Defeated Petar Belberov (Bulgaria) 3:0
- 1/2: Lost to Joseph Joyce (Great Britain) TKO 3
- Olympic box-off: Lost to Ali Eren Demirezen (Turkey) WO

== Professional boxing record ==
| 12 fights | 10 wins | 2 losses |
|---|---|---|
| By knockout | 8 | 2 |
| By decision | 2 | 0 |

| No. | Result | Record | Opponent | Type | Round, time | Date | Location | Notes |
|---|---|---|---|---|---|---|---|---|
| 12 | Loss | 10–2 | Moses Itauma | TKO | 1 (6), 1:53 | 28 Oct 2023 | Kingdom Arena, Riyadh, Saudi Arabia | |
| 11 | Loss | 10–1 | Terrell Jamal Woods | KO | 4 (8), 2:59 | 10 Dec 2022 | Sports Arena, Memphis, Tennessee, US | |
| 10 | Win | 10–0 | Milton Núñez | TKO | 3 (8), 0:45 | 23 April 2022 | Abu-Bekr Temple, Sioux City, Iowa, US | |
| 9 | Win | 9–0 | Deon Ronny Hale | TKO | 2 (6), 2:43 | 20 Nov 2021 | Manual Artime Community Center Theater, Miami, Florida, US | |
| 8 | Win | 8–0 | Guillermo Del Rio | TKO | 2 (6), 2:30 | 23 Oct 2021 | Convention Center, Tampa, Florida, US | |
| 7 | Win | 7–0 | Rodolzo Damahl Lewis | TKO | 2 (6), 0:41 | 24 Sep 2021 | Manual Artime Community Center Theater, Miami, Florida, US | |
| 6 | Win | 6–0 | Thomas Hawkins | UD | 6 (6) | 20 Aug 2021 | Airport Hilton, Miami, Florida, US | |
| 5 | Win | 5–0 | Grover Young | UD | 6 (6) | 31 Jul 2021 | Cosmopolitan Lounge, Decatur, Georgia, US | |
| 4 | Win | 4–0 | Terrence Walker | TKO | 2 (4), 1:34 | 9 Jul 2021 | Airport Hilton, Miami, Florida, US | |
| 3 | Win | 3–0 | Dakota Talbott | TKO | 2 (4), 1:08 | 5 Jun 2021 | Champion Boxing Gym, Jonesboro, Georgia, US | |
| 2 | Win | 2–0 | Jose Lugo Rivera | TKO | 1 (4), 1:50 | 22 May 2021 | Media Pro Studios, Medley, Florida, US | |
| 1 | Win | 1–0 | Johnny Jackson | TKO | 1 (4), 2:32 | 6 Mar 2021 | InterContinental Miami, Miami, Florida, US | |
