= Ömer Karaevli =

Turkish equestrian

Personal information
- Born: 11 September 1977 (age 48) Ankara, Turkey

Ömer Karaevli (born 11 September 1977, in Ankara) is a Turkish show jumping rider.

== Personal life ==
Karaevli is the son of Ahmet Karaevli, a politician of the Motherland Party (ANAP) and Minister of State in the Özal cabinet (1983–1987).

Karaevli lives in Nettetal, Germany with his Dutch spouse Roos, daughter Leyla and son Omer.

== Sport career ==
Karaevli performed equestrian sport at Ankara Atlıspor Club before he moved to Europe. Currently, he runs his own stable "Stal Karaevli" in Swolgen, Netherlands.

He earned a quota spot for 2016 Summer Olympics to represent Turkey with his Belgian Warmblood horse "Dadjak Ter Puttenen". He will be the first Turkish equestrian to participate at the Olympics since 56 years.
