= Mehmet Nadir Ünal =

Turkish boxer

Personal information
- Nationality: Turkish
- Born: 13 January 1993 (age 33) Adana, Turkey
- Home town: Konya, Turkey
- Weight: 81 kg (179 lb)

Sport
- Country: Turkey
- Sport: Kickboxing, amateur boxing
- Event: Light heavyweight
- Club: Fenerbahçe Boxing
Medal record
Representing Turkey
Kickboxing
WAKO European Senior Championships
Bronze medal – third place	2012 Ankara	-81 kg
Boxing
Tournaments
Bronze medal – third place	2016 Samsun	-81 kg

Mehmet Nadir Ünal (born 13 January 1993) is a Turkish kickboxer specialized in the K-1 event, and amateur boxer competing in the light heavyweight (-81 kg) division. He is a member of Fenerbahçe Boxing in Istanbul.

Ünal was born in Adana on 13 January 1993. He moved with his family to Konya, where he began boxing at age of 14.

He won the bronze medal in the K-1 event at the 2012 WAKO European Senior Kickboxing Championships in Ankara, Turkey.

He earned a quota spot for 2016 Summer Olympics after taking a bronze medal at the 2016 European Boxing Olympic Qualification Tournament in Samsun, Turkey.

== Professional career ==
Ünal made his professional debut on July 23, 2021 against Jorge Luis Martinez. Ünal won the fight via a second-round TKO.

== Professional boxing record ==
13 fights	13 wins	0 losses
By knockout	11	0
By decision	2	0

No.	Result	Record	Opponent	Type	Round, time	Date	Location	Notes
13	Win	13–0	Jan Czerklewicz	KO	1 (10), 2:56	5 Jun 2025	Montreal Casino, Montreal, Canada	Won WBC Continental Americas light heavyweight title
12	Win	12–0	Ezequiel Maderna	TKO	3 (10), 1:41	6 Feb 2025	Montreal Casino, Montreal, Canada	
11	Win	11–0	Armenak Hovhannisyan	TKO	3 (10), 2:46	17 Oct 2024	Casino du Lac-Leamy, Gatineau, Canada	
10	Win	10–0	Rodolfo Gomez	TKO	4 (10), 2:17	25 May 2024	Centre Gervais Auto, Shawinigan, Canada	
9	Win	9–0	Facundo Galovar	UD	8	7 Mar 2024	Montreal Casino, Montreal, Canada	
8	Win	8–0	Dragan Lepei	TKO	1 (8), 0:57	13 Jan 2024	Videotron Centre, Quebec City, Canada	
7	Win	7–0	Jaime Hernandez	RTD	2 (8), 3:00	14 Nov 2023	Montreal Casino, Montreal, Canada	
6	Win	6–0	Luca Spadaccini	RTD	1 (8), 3:00	11 Oct 2023	Montreal Casino, Montreal, Canada	
5	Win	5–0	Hernan David Perez	UD	6	8 Sep 2023	Casino du Lac-Leamy, Gatineau, Canada	
4	Win	4–0	Roberto Moreno	TKO	2 (6), 1:31	5 May 2023	Hotel Holiday Inn, Cuernavaca, Mexico	
3	Win	3–0	Israel Nava Lopez	TKO	2 (4), 1:43	14 Jan 2023	Domo Deportivo Metropolitano, Ciudad Nezahualcóyotl, Mexico	
2	Win	2–0	Jair Sena	TKO	3 (6), 1:37	27 Aug 2021	Hotel Holiday Inn, Cuernavaca, Mexico	
1	Win	1–0	Jorge Luis Martinez	TKO	2 (6), 1:41	23 Jul 2021	Hotel Holiday Inn, Cuernavaca, Mexico	
