= Peter Müllenberg =

Dutch boxer (born 1987)

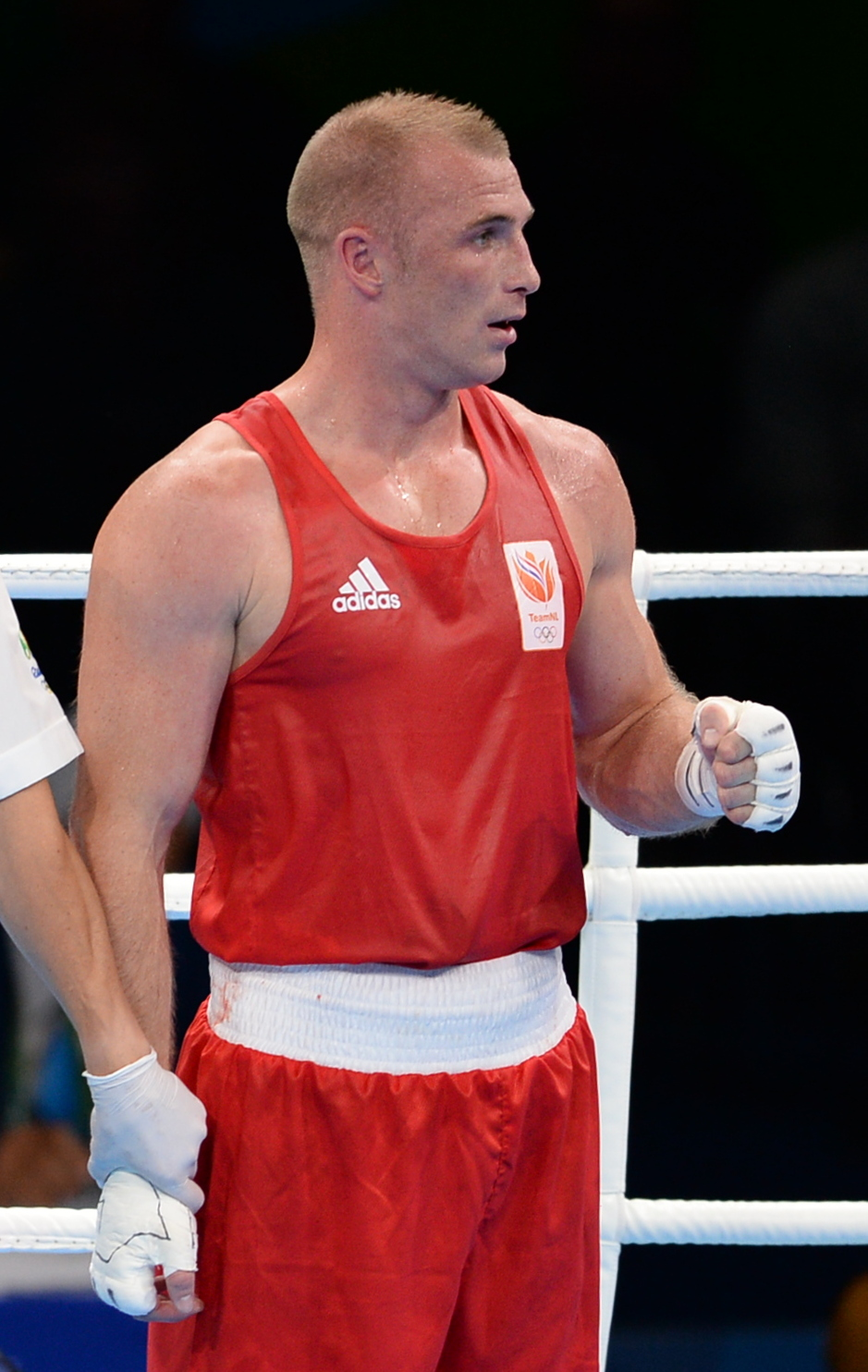
- Müllenberg at the 2016 Olympics

Personal information
- Born: December 30, 1987 (age 38) Almelo, the Netherlands
- Height: 1.83 m (6 ft 0 in)

Sport
- Sport: Boxing
- Club: Apeldoornse Boks en Conditie Club
- Coached by: Hennie van Bemmel
Medal record
Representing the Netherlands
European Championships
Silver medal – second place	2013 Minsk	-81 kg
Silver medal – second place	2015 Samokov	-81 kg

Peter Müllenberg (born 30 December 1987 in Almelo) is an amateur heavyweight boxer from the Netherlands who won silver medals at the 2013 and 2015 European championships.

== Career ==
Müllenberg competed at world championships, including at the 2011 World Amateur Boxing Championships (middleweight), 2013 AIBA World Boxing Championships and 2015 AIBA World Boxing Championships. He was also part of the Dutch team at the 2015 European Games in Baku.

Müllenberg won the silver medal at both the 2013 European Amateur Boxing Championships and 2015 European Amateur Boxing Championships. At the 2016 European Boxing Olympic Qualification Tournament in April 2016 he qualified for the 2016 Summer Olympics after beating Mehmet Ünal in the semi-final. He is the first Dutch boxer since 1992 who qualifies for the Summer Olympics. He was eliminated in the second bout at the Olympics.

Although initially motivated to compete at the 2020 Summer Olympics he later lost motivation and failed to qualify.

== Personal life ==
Müllenberg has a son Noah with his ex-partner Essja. He has a son Eymen and another child with his wife Asiye, whom he married in 2017. Since August 2009 he served with the Royal Netherlands Army. As of 2019 he was no longer working for the army.

Müllenberg converted to Islam around 2013.

In 2019 Müllenberg was convicted of threathening his ex-partner and sentenced to sixty hours community service. On appeal in the same case in 2022 he was convicted of threatening his ex-partner, illegal possession of weapons and destroying furniture. His sentence was lowered to forty hours community service. In 2019 he survived two assassination attempts in which shots were fired at him.
