= Vazgen Safaryants =

Belarusian boxer (born 1984)

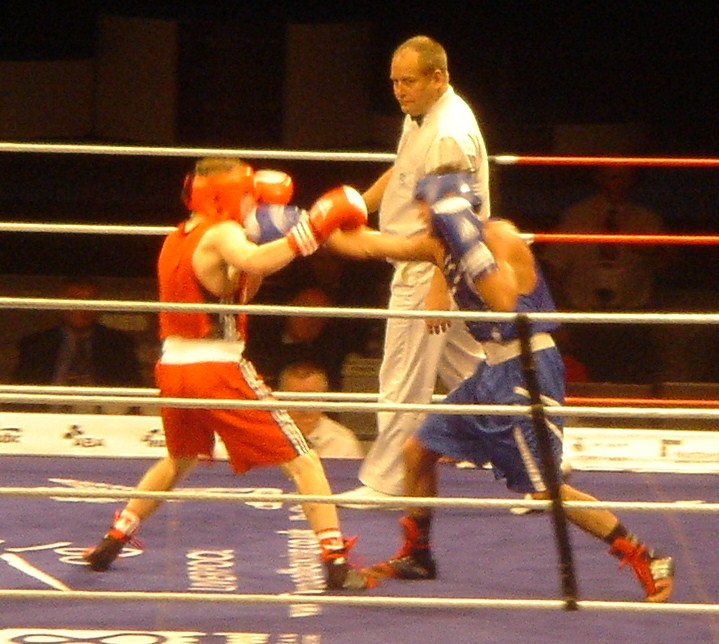
- Leonid Kostylev (Red) and Vazgen Safaryants (Blue)
Medal record
Representing Belarus
Men's Boxing
European Amateur Championships
| Silver medal – second place | 2008 Liverpool | Lightweight |
| Silver medal – second place | 2013 Minsk | Lightweight |
| Bronze medal – third place | 2006 Plovdiv | Lightweight |

Vazgen Safaryants (born 22 October 1984 in Ordzhonikidze) is a Belarusian amateur boxer of Armenian origin best known for placing third at the 2006 European Amateur Boxing Championships.
