= Vít Král =

Czech boxer (born 1992)

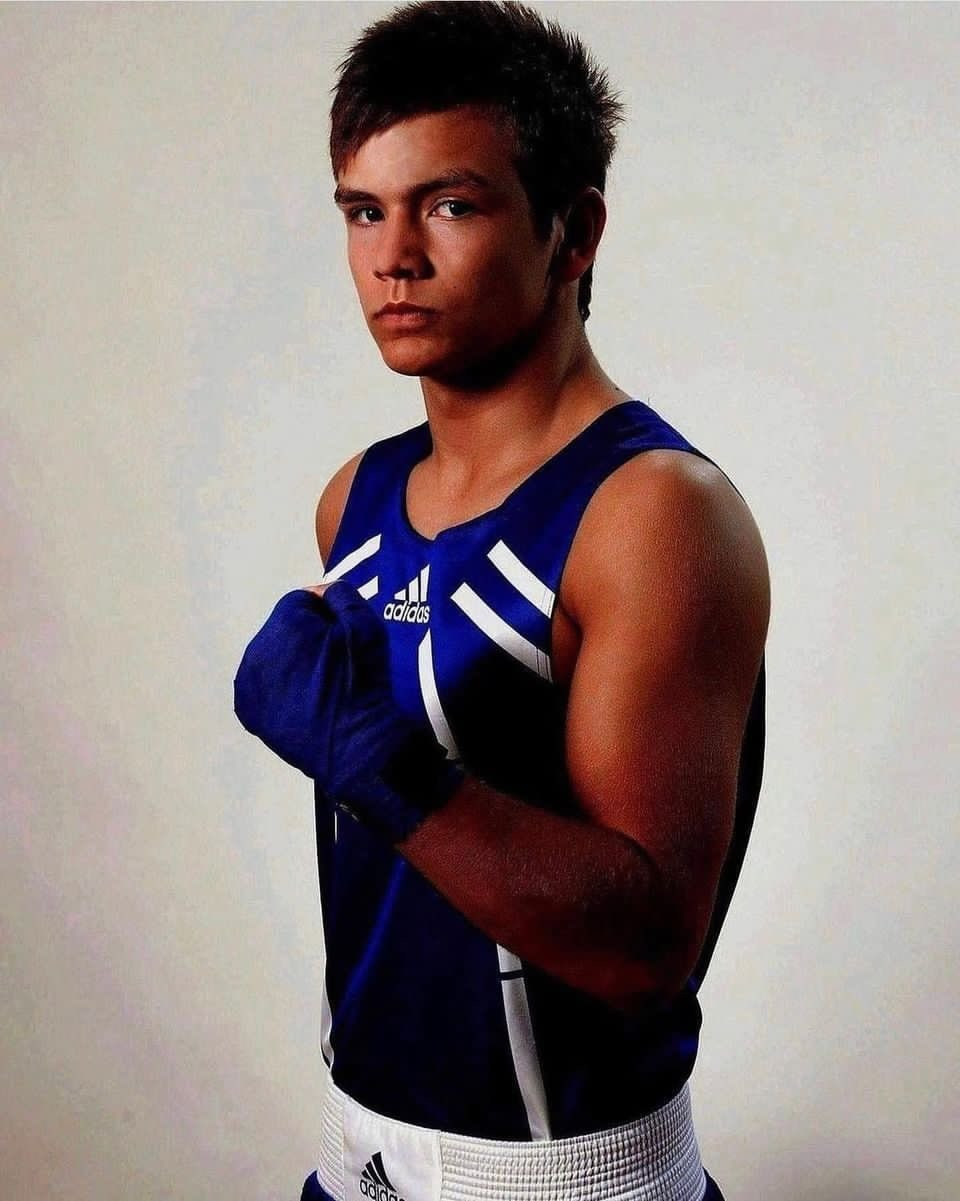
- Vit Král in 2009

Personal information
- Nickname: King (Note: král means 'king' in Czech)
- Nationality: Czech
- Born: 22 March 1992 (age 34) Brno, Czech Republic
- Height: 6 ft (180 cm)
- Weight: 165 lb (75 kg)

Boxing career
- Weight class: Heavyweight
Medal record
Men's amateur boxing
Representing Czech Republic
Silver medal – second place	CZE Championship of men 2008	69 kg
Gold medal – first place	CZE Championship of men 2009	69 kg
Gold medal – first place	Internacional IBA Tournament 2009	69 kg
Gold medal – first place	CZE Championship of men 2012	75 kg
Gold medal – first place	CZE Championship of men 2014	75 kg

Vit Král (Czech: [vi:t kra:l]; born 22 March 1992) is a Czech boxer. He is twelve times champion of the Czech Republic in various age categories. He was member of the Czech national team and a boxing coach.

== Life ==
Vít Král was born on 22 March 1992 in Brno. He was a student of the Ludvík Daňek Sports High School. In his childhood, he was first involved in football. He has doing boxing since he was ten years old. His coach was his father Vít Král Sr., former champion of Czechoslovakia. As an extraordinary talent, he was able to box thanks to a Czech boxing association exemption at the Czech Senior Championships (men), where he fought for the first time at the age of fifteen, but was defeated on points in the 57 kilograms (125.66 pounds) category.

However, an injury to his right wrist (fracture of the scaphoid ) and a dislocated shoulder limited the promising development of his career. He had three operations related to his injuries. After healing these injuries, he bounced back by winning the Czech Republic men's championship in 2012. He also boxed in the Czech national tournament for the Prostějov boxing club DTJ Prostějov and Rohovník Armex Děčín. After finishing his active career, he has been coaching and working with young boxers. He works as a coach in the Kometa Boxing Brno club. Among his charges is also Jindřich Janečka.

== Sports career ==
- 2005
  - Champion of the Czech Republic, boys, 48 kilograms (105.82 pounds) category.
  - Champion of the Czech Republic, youth, category 48 kilograms (105.82 pounds), RSC victory (victory by stopping the match by the ring referee).
- 2006
  - Champion of the Czech Republic, boys, 50 kilograms (110.23 pounds), RSC victory.
  - Champion of the Czech Republic, youth, 51 kilograms (112.44 pounds) category, RSC victory.
- 2007
  - Champion of the Czech Republic, boys, 57 kilograms (125.66 pounds) category, victory on points.
  - Czech Republic Champion, youth, category 60 kilograms (132.28 pounds), RSC victory.
- 2008
  - Czech Republic Champion, boys, 63 kilograms (138.89 pounds) category, RSC victory.
  - Czech Republic Champion, youth, 60 kilograms (132.28 pounds) category, WO victory (win without a fight).
  - Second place at the Czech Republic Championship, men, 69 kilograms (152.12 pounds) category, loss on points in the final.
- 2009
  - Czech National Champion, youth, 69 kilograms (152.12 pounds) category, RSC victory.
  - Czech Republic Champion, men, 69 kilograms (152.12 pounds) category, victory on points.
  - Winner of the International youth Tournament in Mostar, 69 kilograms (152.12 pounds) category, victory by forfeit.
- 2012
  - Champion of the Czech Republic, men, 75 kilograms (165.35 pounds) category, victory on points.
- 2014
  - Champion of the Czech Republic, men, 75 kilograms (165.35 pounds) category, victory on points.
- 2015
  - Participant of the European Games in Baku 2015 after being nominated by the Czech Olympic Committee.
