= Siarhei Novikau (boxer) =

Belarusian boxer

Personal information
- Born: Minsk, Belarus
- Height: 195 cm (6 ft 5 in)

Boxing career
- Weight class: Light-heavyweight; Heavyweight
- Stance: Orthodox

Boxing record
- Total fights: 10
- Wins: 9
- Win by KO: 9
- Losses: 0
- No contests: 1
Medal record
Men's amateur boxing
Representing Belarus
European Championships
Bronze medal – third place	2013 Minsk	-81 kg

Siarhei Vladimirovich Novikau, sometimes spelled Sergey Novikov, (Russian: Сергей Владимирович Новиков) is a Belarusian professional boxer. As an amateur he won a bronze medal at the 2013 European Championships.

In 2018 Siarhei Novikau started his professional career.

== Amateur career ==
Siarhei Novikau competed at the 2013 AIBA World Boxing Championships. He was also part of the Belarus team at the 2015 European Games in Baku and at the 2016 European Boxing Olympic Qualification Tournament in April 2016 for qualified for the 2016 Summer Olympics.

Siarhei Novikau won the bronze medal at the 2013 European Amateur Boxing Championships in Minsk.

== Professional boxing record ==
10 fights	9 wins	0 losses
By knockout	9	0
By decision	0	0
No contests	1	

No.	Result	Record	Opponent	Type	Round, time	Date	Location	Notes
10	Win	9–0 (1)	(United States) Antwaun Tubbs	KO	2 (6), 0:48	19 Dec 2021	(United States) Atlanta Marriott Century Center, Atlanta, Georgia	
9	Win	8–0 (1)	(United States) Quintell Thompson	TKO	1 (6), 2:41	11 Dec 2021	(United States) Buckhead Fight Club, Atlanta, Georgia	
8	Win	7–0 (1)	(United States) Kevin Brown	TKO	2 (8), 2:46	24 Sep 2021	(United States) Manual Artime Community Center Theater, Miami, Florida	
7	Win	6–0 (1)	(Colombia) Milton Núñez	TKO	2 (6), 2:59	22 May 2021	(United States) Media Pro Studios, Medley, Florida	
6	Win	5–0 (1)	(Argentina) Pablo Daniel Nievas	KO	1 (6), 1:43	30 Jan 2021	(United States) Four Ambassadors Hotel, Miami, Florida	
5	Win	4–0 (1)	(Argentina) Mariano Jose Riva	TKO	1 (6), 1:51	17 Oct 2020	(United States) Manual Artime Community Center Theater, Miami, Florida	
4	Win	3–0 (1)	(Mexico) Gabriel Agramon	RTD	5 (8), 3:00	5 Oct 2019	Gimnasio Polifuncional, Merida, Yucatán, Mexico	
3	NC	2–0 (1)	(Mexico) Guillermo Reyes Dominguez	NC	4 (10), 0:57	5 Apr 2019	Arena Auditorio de la CMT, Merida, Yucatán, Mexico	NC after accidental headbutt.
2	Win	2–0	(Brazil) Gilberto Matheus Domingos	TKO	1 (10)	21 Dec 2018	Anthony Nesty sporthal, Paramaribo, Suriname	
1	Win	1–0	(Mexico) Bladimir Hernandez	TKO	1 (6), 1:29	31 Aug 2018	Convention Center, West Palm Beach, Florida, United States	
