= Zoltán Harcsa =

Hungarian boxer (born 1992)

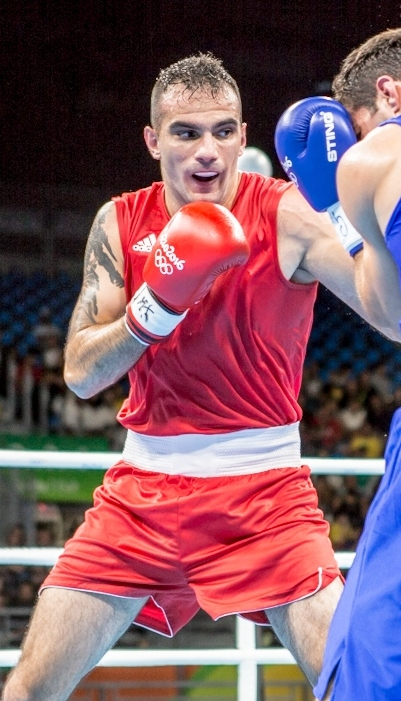
- Harcsa at the 2016 Olympics

Personal information
- Full name: Zoltán Ádám Harcsa
- Born: 20 November 1992 (age 33) Budapest, Hungary
- Education: University of Physical Education, Budapest
- Height: 184 cm (6 ft 0 in)
- Weight: 75 kg (165 lb)

Sport
- Sport: Boxing
- Weight class: Middleweight
- Club: Unio Kispest SE; Ferencvaros
- Coached by: laszlo Kovacs (national); Imre Szanto (personal)
Medal record
Men's amateur boxing
Representing Hungary
European Games
Bronze medal – third place	2015 Baku	Middleweight
European Championships
Bronze medal – third place	2013 Minsk	Middleweight
Bronze medal – third place	2017 Kharkiv	Middleweight

Zoltán Ádám Harcsa (born 20 November 1992) is a Hungarian middleweight boxer who won bronze medals at the 2013 and 2017 European Championships and the 2015 European Games. He competed at the 2012 and 2016 Olympics, but was eliminated in the second-third bout on both occasions. His brother Norbert is also an international boxer.

== World Series of Boxing record ==
2 fights	1 win	1 loss
By knockout	0	0
By decision	1	1

No.	Result	Record	Team	Opponent (Team)	Type	Round, time	Date	Location	Notes
2	Loss	1–1	British Lionhearts	Nizar Trimech (France Fighting Roosters)	SD	5	6 Apr 2017	(United Kingdom) London, Great Britain	
1	Win	1–0	British Lionhearts	Youness Gharroumi (Morocco Atlas Lions)	UD	5	8 Mar 2017	(United Kingdom) London, Great Britain	WSB debut
