= Miklós Varga =

Hungarian boxer (born 1987)

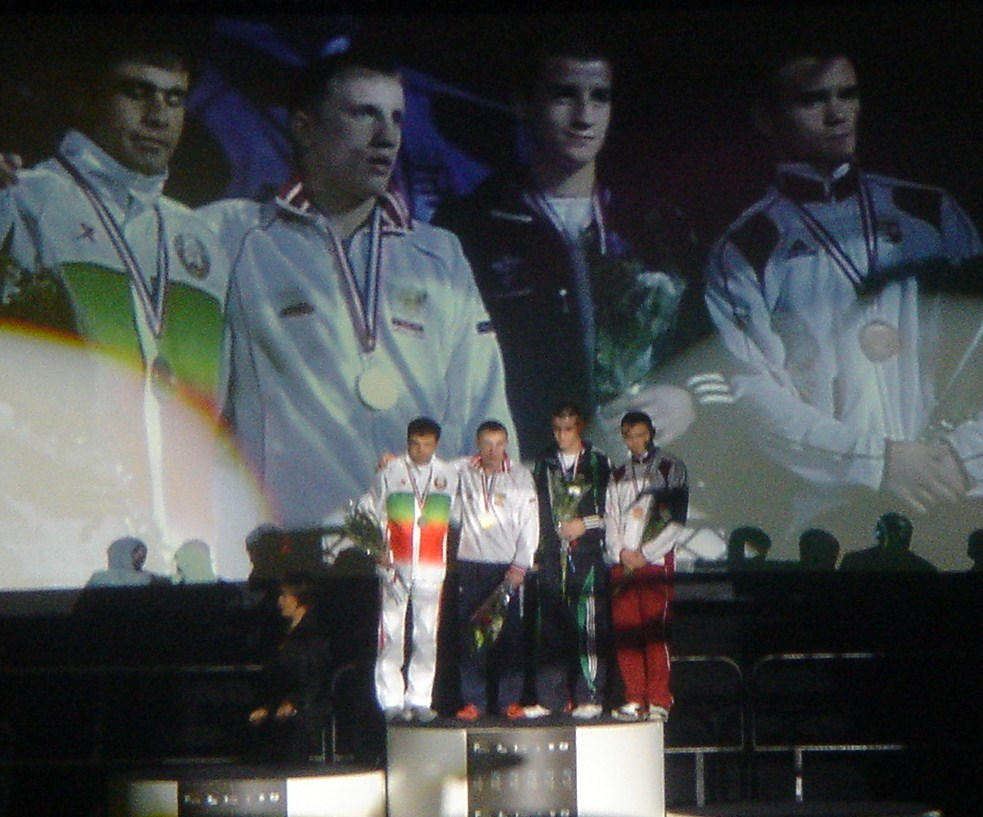
- Miklós Varga (far right)
Medal record
Representing Hungary
Men's Boxing
European Amateur Championships
Silver medal – second place	2008 Liverpool	Lightweight
Bronze medal – third place	2013 Minsk	Lightweight

Miklos Varga (born 26 August 1987) is a Hungarian amateur boxer who competed at the 2008 Olympics but lost his only bout at lightweight to Merey Akshalov. At the 2012 Summer Olympics, he again lost in the first round, this time to Evaldas Petrauskas.
