= Oybek Mamazulunov =

Uzbekistani boxer

Medal record

Representing Uzbekistan

Men's Amateur boxing

World Amateur Championships
Bronze medal – third place	2013 Almaty	Light Heavyweight

Asian Championships
Gold medal – first place	2013 Amman	Light Heavyweight

Oybek Mamazulunov is an amateur boxer from Uzbekistan. He won the gold medal at the 2013 Asian Amateur Boxing Championships after defeating Adilbek Niyazymbetov of Kazakhstan. He also reached the semifinals of the 2013 AIBA World Boxing Championships and thus secured a medal for his country.
