= Nikoloz Sekhniashvili =

Georgian professional boxer

Personal information
- Nationality: Georgian
- Born: 9 December 1993 (age 32) Gori, Georgia
- Height: 5 ft 8 in (173 cm)
- Weight: Middleweight

Boxing career
- Reach: 70 1/2 in (179 cm)
- Stance: Orthodox

Boxing record
- Total fights: 9
- Wins: 8
- Win by KO: 6
- Losses: 1

Nikoloz Sekhniashvili (Georgian: ნიკოლოზ სეხნიაშვილი born 9 December 1993) is a Georgian professional boxer. As an amateur, Sekhniashvili represented Georgia at the 2015 European Games as a heavyweight.

== Professional career ==
Sekhniashvili made his professional debut on 29 April 2018, at the age of 24. Currently he lives in South Florida and trains with Javiel Centeno. Before joining Centeno's gym, Sekhniashvili had been living and training in Athens, Greece with his original coach Greg Mallios.

In 2019, Sekhniashvili signed a promotional contract with Top Rank.

In November 2019, Sekhniashvili made his debut fight under the Top Rank banner against Eddie Gates at the Addition Financial Arena in Orlando, Florida, winning via technical knockout (TKO).

His next fight took place at MGM Grand Las Vegas where he fought against Isiah Jones in a six-rounder at super middleweight. Sekhniashvili defeated the opponent via 6-round decision.

On 3 August 2021 Sekhniashvili faced his first defeat via 6 Round Decision against Guido Emmanuel Schramm in Madison Square Garden as he suffered a serious injury.

After almost 15 months out of the ring, Sekhniashvili returned to action in Cleveland, Ohio against the undefeated Rodriguez (6-0 2 KOs) over six rounds. Sekhniashvili picked up the victory by TKO in round 3 of 6.

== Professional boxing record ==
9 fights	8 wins	1 loss
By knockout	6	0
By decision	2	1

No.	Result	Record	Opponent	Type	Round, time	Date	Location	Notes
9	Win	8–1	(United States) David Rodriguez	TKO	3 (6)	12 November 2022	(United States) Rocket Mortgage FieldHouse, Cleveland, Ohio, U.S.	
8	Loss	7-1	(Argentina) Guido Emmanuel Schramm	DEC	6 (6)	3 August 2021	(United States) Hulu Theater, New York City, New York U.S.	
7	Win	7–0	(United States) Alexis Gaytan	TKO	4 (6)	4 September 2020	(United States) Osceola Heritage Park, Kissimmee, Florida, U.S.	
6	Win	6–0	(United States) Isiah Jones	UD	6	16 June 2020	(United States) MGM Grand Conference Center, Paradise, Nevada, U.S.	
5	Win	5–0	(United States) Eddie Gates	TKO	1 (6)	16 November 2019	(United States) UCF Arena, Orlando, Florida, U.S.	
4	Win	4–0	(Serbia) Danijel Arandelovic	KO	2 (8)	7 June 2019	Galatsi Olympic Hall Athens, Greece	
3	Win	3–0	(United States) Antonio Louis Hernandez	KO	1 (4)	26 April 2019	(United States) Quiet Cannon Country Club, Montebello, California, U.S.	
2	Win	2–0	(United States) Estevan Payan	KO	1 (4)	4 Apr 2019	(United States) The Hangar, Costa Mesa, California, U.S.	
1	Win	1–0	(Germany) Michael Klempert	PTS	4	29 Apr 2018	Faliro Coastal Zone Olympic Complex, Athens, Greece	
