= Ainar Karlson =

Estonian boxer

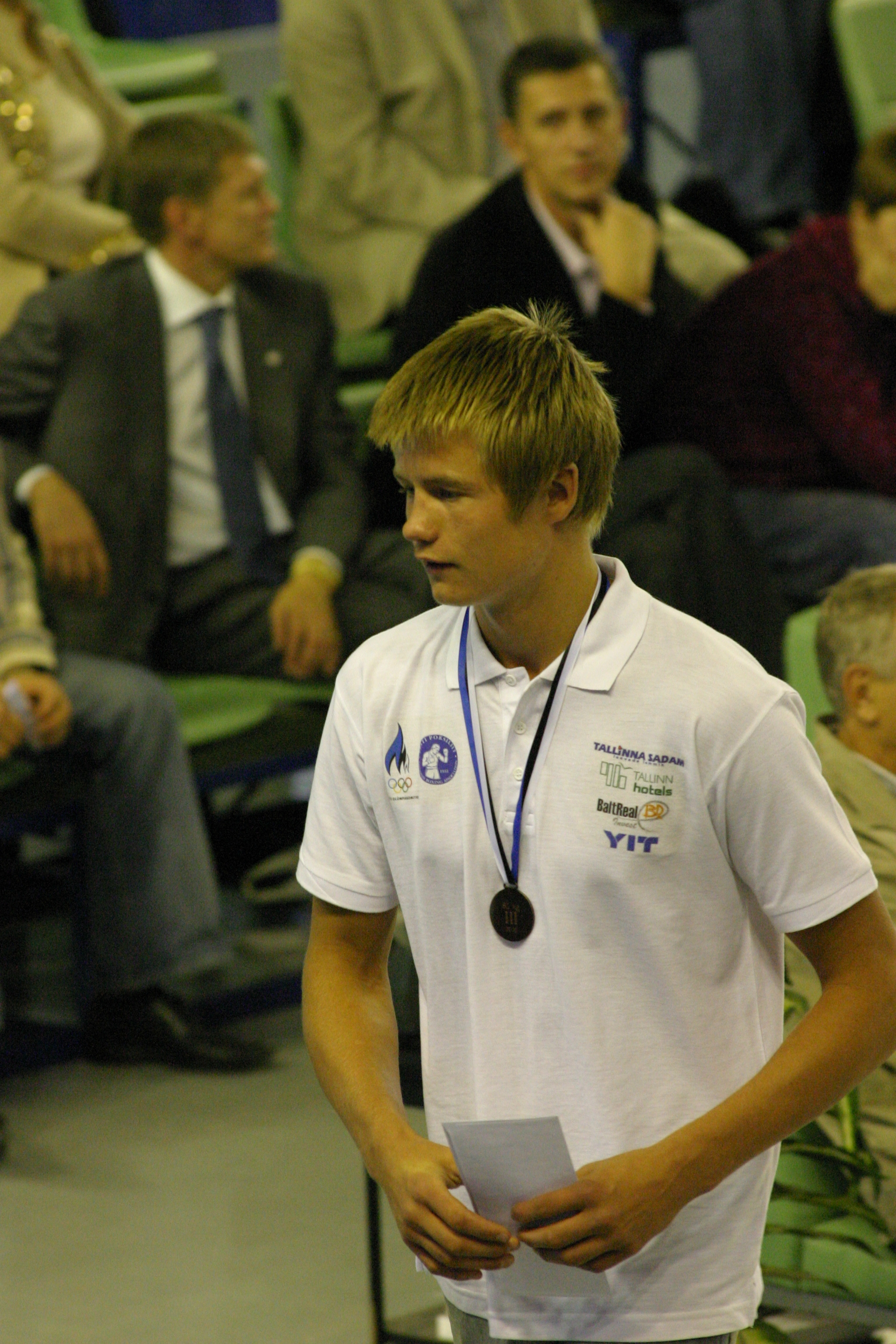
Ainar Karlson (2006)

Ainar Karlson (born 13 October 1988) is an Estonian boxer.

He was born in Tallinn.

He started his boxing exercising in 2000. Since 2005 he has been a member of Estonian national boxing team. He is 14-times Estonian champion (between 2006 and 2020). In 2012 he signed a contract with Kazakhstan club Astana Arlans. In 2013 the club won World Series of Boxing (WSB) world league.

In 2009–2011 he was named the Best Boxer of Estonia, and in 2012 the Best Professional Boxer of Estonia.
