= Vladimir Margaryan =

Armenian boxer

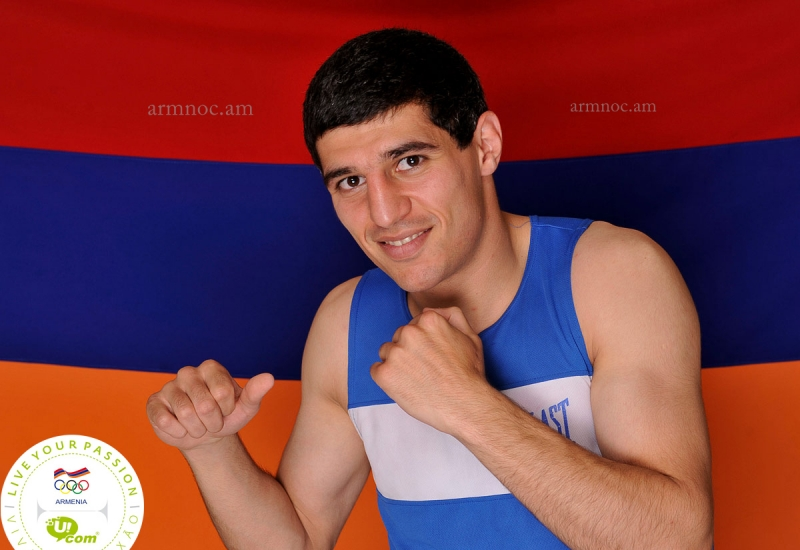

Personal information
- Born: 8 March 1991 (age 35) Yerevan, Armenia

Boxing career

Vladimir Margaryan (Armenian: Վլադիմիր Մարգարյան; born 8 March 1991) is an Armenian boxer. He competed in the men's welterweight event at the 2016 Summer Olympics.
