= Concerns and controversies at the 2012 Summer Paralympics =

A number of notable controversies and concerns associated with the 2012 Summer Paralympics in London, UK were the subject of public debate and media commentary.

== NBC coverage ==
The US broadcaster NBC faced continuing criticism over its decision not to broadcast the opening ceremony of the Paralympics and also for the limited amount of total footage of the Games broadcast. NBC showed a total of five and a half hours of Paralympic footage in the United States.

== Victoria Arlen reclassification ==
Just prior to the start of the games, 17-year-old swimmer Victoria Arlen's level of disability was reclassified, resulting in her no longer being eligible for the games. An International Paralympic Committee (IPC) spokesperson was quoted as "She was reclassified on Monday and found non-eligible; she did not meet the eligibility criteria for her chosen sport."

Following a successful appeal, Arlen was allowed to compete in her original S6 class. Of the decision she said "It has been a rollercoaster but I have an incredible Team USA that has been supporting me, but it is what it is, it comes with the sport and I am just happy to be here, happy to swim and happy to represent my country. I'm ready to go always." She went on to win silver medal in the S6 400m Freestyle. Arlen had taken the S6 400m Freestyle world record in June at the American Paralympic trials.

== Jody Cundy disqualification ==
Cyclist Jody Cundy attracted criticism for his reaction to a disqualification in the C4/C5 1 km time trial, which followed a dispute over a starting gate opening. He was quoted as shouting at his coaches, "I fell out of the gate because the fucking gate didn't open. Everybody else gets the fucking re-ride… you don’t know the half of it. Do you know what it’s like? Four years of my life. One minute three, I could have destroyed everyone… in front of a six thousand home crowd. I'll never get this opportunity ever, ever, ever again." He had to be physically restrained by the team mechanic. He later returned to the arena to apologise to the crowd, saying, "I would like to apologise for my language, I think that even after all that noise you might have been able to hear my language… Congratulations to all my fellow competitors."

== Channel 4 coverage ==
Channel 4, which has the UK broadcast rights for the Paralympics, attracted criticism for several elements of its opening ceremony coverage. This criticism mainly focused on the use of adverts within the broadcast, but also on what some viewers saw as the overly political nature of the commentary.

A spokesman from Channel 4 was quoted as saying "We took the decision to run less advertising during the opening ceremony than would usually be broadcast in our peak time programming... But Channel 4 is a commercially funded public service broadcaster and advertising allows us to invest in original programming and events such as the Paralympics."

Channel 4 also came under criticism for airing, on its show The Last Leg With Adam Hills, a tweet that asked whether it is acceptable to hit disabled people.

== Oscar Pistorius remarks ==
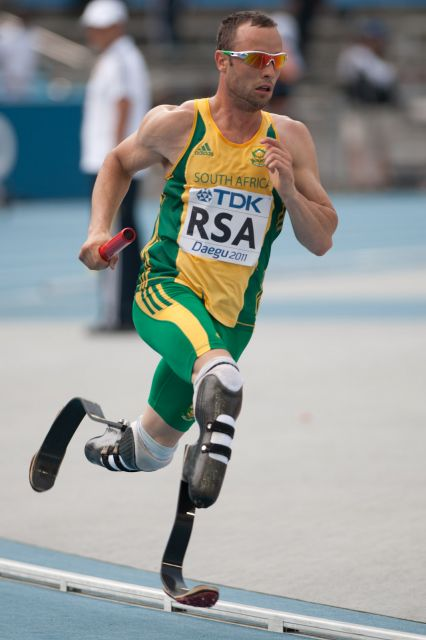
Oscar Pistorius

Oscar Pistorius established a new world record of 21.30 seconds in his 200m heat on 1 September, but was defeated in the final the next day by Alan Oliveira of Brazil. Pistorius took silver, and then created a controversy by complaining about the length of Oliveira's blades. He later apologized for the timing of his remarks, but not the content of his complaint. The IPC confirmed the length of Oliveira’s blades were proportional to his body according to the rules, with all the finalists measured before the race. The IPC also confirmed that Pistorius had raised the issue of blade length with it six weeks prior to the race. The South African Sports Confederation and Olympic Committee issued a statement welcoming Pistorius's apology for his outburst and declared their full support for him and promised to assist him in discussions with the IPC about the issue of lengthened prosthetics after the conclusion of the Games. The IPC expressed willingness to engage with Pistorius about the issue. Australian runner Jack Swift, USA runner Jerome Singleton, and other athletes also expressed support for Pistorius's position.

== Powerlifters arrest ==
Two Jordanian powerlifters and a Jordanian trainer were arrested for sexual assault, following complaints in Belfast, Northern Ireland, where the squad was one of several national teams training before the Paralympics. The Jordanian Paralympic Committee (JPC) announced that the men would return to Jordan, and then return later to court for their hearing. The committee also released a statement saying "The JPC denounces in the strongest terms possible all types of harassment and abuse, and wishes to reaffirm that this type of abhorrent behaviour is totally and utterly unacceptable and is to be condemned at all times."

== Doping ==
Three powerlifters were given a two-year ban for doping. Russians Nikolay Marfin and Vadim Rakitin tested positive for human growth hormone a week before the start of the games, and Georgian Shota Omarashvili was tested positive for steroids. Rakitin competed in the men's under-90kg class, but Marfin was prevented from taking part in the 100-plus kg class, and Omarashvili competed in the under-60kg event in which he failed to complete a lift.

== See also ==
- Cheating at the Paralympic Games
- Concerns and controversies over the 2008 Summer Olympics
- Concerns and controversies over the 2010 Commonwealth Games
- Concerns and controversies over the 2010 Winter Olympics
- Controversies at the 2012 Summer Olympics
