= Concerns and controversies at the 2012 Summer Olympics =

A number of controversies and concerns associated with the 2012 Summer Olympics in London became the subject of public debate and media commentary.

== Prior to the games ==
=== IOC policy ===
==== Brand protection ====
Protection of the Olympic brand was the subject of some criticism. The Olympic rings themselves are protected in the United Kingdom under the Olympic Symbol etc. (Protection) Act 1995; under provisions set out by the London Olympic Games and Paralympic Games Act 2006, the London Organising Committee of the Olympic Games and Paralympic Games (LOCOG) are empowered to prevent the misuse of Olympic branding leading up to the 2012 Games. The acts aim to prevent unauthorised commercial association with the games by traders (such as using the Olympic rings in a shop window) and to prevent attempts at ambush marketing at games events, but the constraints detailed in the guidelines issued by LOCOG have been criticised by some commentators as a form of censorship.

The guidelines specify a range of trademarked logos and designs as well as certain "Listed Expressions" and protected words that advertisers may not use, which include the words "London" and "2012". Even if an advertiser does not mention the Olympics or use any of the listed words, any visual or audio representation of London and sports may be considered by a court to be an infringement of LOCOG's rights and subject to a fine of £20,000 or possible imprisonment. A number of individuals and businesses fell foul of the restrictions, including a lingerie shop in Leicester and a Plymouth café selling Olympic torch baguettes. An exception to these rules was successfully negotiated by the restaurant chain Little Chef, who were permitted by LOCOG to continue selling their fried "Olympic Breakfast" because the item has carried that name on their menu since 1994.

In an interview with BBC journalist Evan Davis, Lord Coe emphasised the need to protect the rights of official sponsors, such as BMW and Adidas, who had contributed large sums of money to the Games. His suggestion that visitors to the London games would not be admitted if they were wearing a Pepsi-branded T-shirt was later retracted by LOCOG, who stated that such rules would apply only to large groups of spectators wearing "visibly branded" clothing.

Criticism also focused on the exclusive rights held by some sponsors to serve and advertise food at and near to Olympic venues; McDonald's held sole rights to sell chips throughout the games, preventing independent food outlets from serving chips with any meal, although an exception was negotiated with McDonald's to allow the sale of traditional British fish and chips. Food sellers also had to comply with food outlet specifications which required prominent display of Coca-Cola branding with limited space for their own products.

==== Eligibility of athletes suspended for doping ====
The IOC amended the Olympic Charter in June 2008 in order to bar athletes suspended for at least six months for a doping offence from competing at the Olympic Games following the end of the suspension. This provision, known as the Osaka Rule or Rule 45, was challenged before the Court of Arbitration for Sport. In October 2011, the court found that the provision was not an eligibility rule, but a sanction not mandated by the World Anti-Doping Code and thus invalid.

Several athletes were allowed to compete at the 2012 Summer Olympics as a result of the ruling, including defending Olympic champion LaShawn Merritt (who was suspended in 2010 for a year for taking over-the-counter male enhancement product, ExtenZe, which contains the banned steroid dehydroepiandrosterone) and Jessica Hardy, a 2012 Olympic gold medalist who also maintained her innocence, claiming the positive test had been caused by tainted supplements. In April 2012, the decision was reaffirmed, when the court found a similar rule for the British team invalid.

==== Women participants and the hijab ====
After an initial dispute, the IOC and associated sports organizations allowed women to participate in the games as athletes or officials while wearing hijabs. According to the Associated Press, religious clerics and religious activists in some countries wanted more modest uniforms.

According to Sports Illustrated, critics charged that allowing the headgear violated IOC Rule 50, which prohibits religious displays in Olympic venues. Critic also argued that countries which required the headgear for their female representatives were practicing gender apartheid and claimed that this should require the same stand that the IOC took against South African apartheid by banning that country from the Olympics for 21 years. A group called "London 2012: Justice for Women" protested the IOC's allowance of the hijab by placing a copy of the Olympic charter into a coffin and then throwing it off Westminster Bridge, while a band played funeral music.

=== Sponsors ===
==== Healthy eating ====
There was criticism that companies that produce junk food, or otherwise unhealthy foods and drinks, were major sponsors of the Olympics, notably McDonald's, Coca-Cola, Cadbury and Heineken, which seemingly conflicts with the Olympian ideal of health and wellness. Critics included the Chief Medical Officer of Wales, Tony Jewell, and the head of sports science of the Great Britain Team. The London Assembly passed a motion calling for a ban on junk food sponsors.

The sponsors were defended on the grounds that they provided a significant income for the event. Jacques Rogge, President of the IOC, acknowledged concerns but noted the importance of sponsorship money and said that the issue of obesity had been raised with such sponsors. McDonald's and Coca-Cola also defended their involvement, stating that healthy eating was the responsibility of the individual to make their own purchasing choices. LOCOG's policy for food provision stated a number of aims, including diversity, hygiene, health and nutrition, and sustainability.

==== Payment services ====
Electronic payment services for Olympic ticketing and in Olympic venues were provided exclusively by Visa under the terms of their global sponsorship deal with the IOC. This led to criticism during ticket sales before the Games, and to complaints of unreliability of payment systems and a shortage of cash points (particularly for cardholders of cards other than those provided by Visa) to obtain cash at Olympic venues during the Games.

=== Security ===
==== Air defence sites ====
The decision by the Ministry of Defence to station soldiers armed with Starstreak surface-to-air missiles on top of the Lexington building, a residential apartment block in Bow, was challenged in court on 10 July by residents of Fred Wigg Tower, another tower in Leytonstone, east London, where missiles were to be sited, under Article 8 and Article 1 of Protocol 1 of the European Convention on Human Rights, over concerns the missiles made them a terrorist target. The judgement from Mr Justice Haddon-Cave was in favour of the siting of the missiles on Fred Wigg Tower. He stated in his judgment:

Residents were under something of a misapprehension regarding the equipment and risks. ... The MoD's voluntary engagement with the community over the plans was immaculate and the residents who challenged the missile sites had misunderstood the facts.

David Enright, the solicitor representing the residents said after the judgement:

The clear implication of today's judgement is that the Ministry of Defence now has the power to militarise the private homes of any person.

==== Security guard shortage ====
In July 2012, the private security firm G4S, which had been contracted to supply security personnel for the Olympics, revealed that it had failed to recruit and train enough staff for the Games. The shortfall was made up by deploying 3,500 troops of the British Armed Forces. Reports in the media claimed some recruits were not able to speak adequate English. An inquiry was held by the United Kingdom Parliament into the issue, and a report issued said that G4S "must bear the cost of its Olympic failure".

=== Nationality issues ===
==== Falkland Islands dispute ====
On 2 May 2012, on the 30th anniversary of the sinking of the Argentine cruiser ARA General Belgrano, an advertising film depicting the captain of Argentina's hockey team, Fernando Zylberberg, training in Stanley, Falkland Islands, was broadcast in Argentina under the slogan "To compete on British soil, we train on Argentine soil." While it was claimed by several major Argentine newspapers that the film had not been commissioned by the Argentine government, with it being produced by the local office of the Young & Rubicam advertising agency, the rights to it were purchased by the Office of the President for national broadcast. An IOC statement said "the games should not be part of a political platform", while Argentine Olympic Committee President Gerardo Werthein stated that "the Olympic Games cannot be used to make political gestures". Zylberberg stated that he had been unaware that the film would be used as a political advert. He subsequently was not selected for the Argentine hockey squad.

==== Regent Street flags display ====
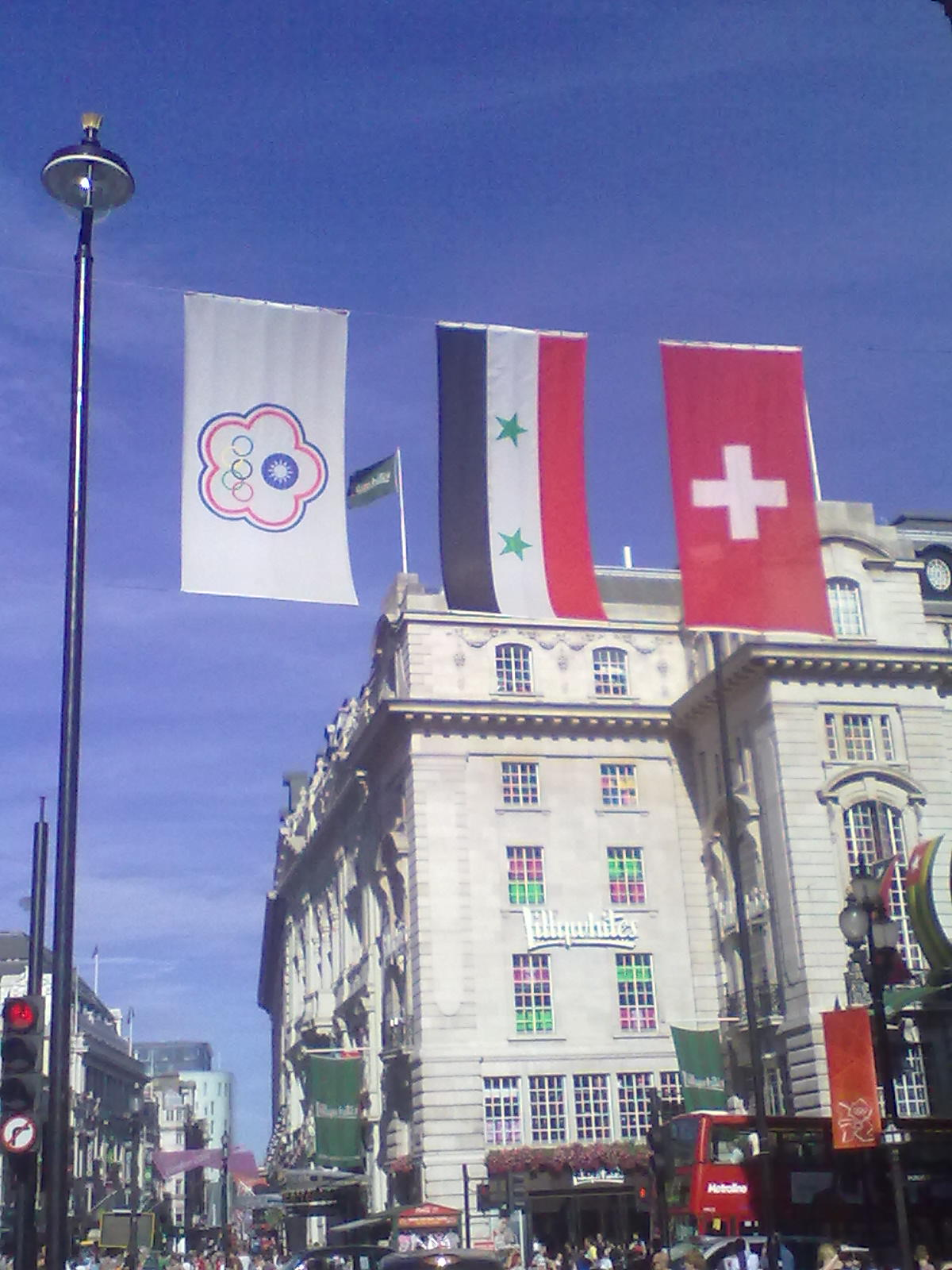
The Chinese Taipei Olympic flag suspended alongside the national flags of Syria and Switzerland in Piccadilly

As part of the buildup to the Games, the flags of all competing nations were suspended over streets in a display around the West End of London by the Regent Street Association (RSA). Included in the display was the Flag of the Republic of China, the official name of Taiwan. Since 1981, the Republic of China (ROC) has not been permitted to compete at the Olympics under its own name, instead using the name "Chinese Taipei", together with the flag of the Chinese Taipei Olympic Committee, which is not Taiwan's national flag. In all official Olympic events and publications, the name and symbols of Chinese Taipei must be used.

As the flag display was not connected to LOCOG, it was not subject to Olympic branding rules. However, officials from the People's Republic of China made a complaint to the Foreign and Commonwealth Office (FCO) about the display of the ROC flag, following which the FCO advised the RSA to replace the ROC flag with the Chinese Taipei Olympic flag. The removal of the national flag led to an official complaint from the Republic of China, with the Senior Representative, Shen Lyu-shun, writing to the RSA stating the view that "the nomenclature regarding Taiwan's participation in the Olympics shall not be applied to the display of the flags in the street", and that matters like this fall "within the scope of freedom of speech" and "shall not be subject to interference by a third party".

==== Competitors' birthplaces in biographies ====
A complaint by the Foreign Ministry of Ukraine was made about the biographies of Russian Olympic team members posted on the official London 2012 Games' website. The biographies referred to the athletes' Ukrainian birthplaces as being located in Russia. Thirty athletes that were identified as not being born in Russia had incorrect birthplace references. Georgia's Olympic Committee had also complained and asked for corrections to be made. Examples included wrestler Besik Kudukhov's birthplace in Tskhilon, South Ossetia, Boxer David Ayrapetyan born in Baku, the capital of Azerbaijan, and weightlifter Alexandr Ivanov from Rustavi in Georgia. Izabella Siemicks, a LOCOG spokesperson, claimed the original biographical information had been provided by the National Olympic Committees (NOCs). LOCOG also apologised for an error in the official match programme for Great Britain's first game in the men's football tournament, mistakenly describing Welsh team member Joe Allen as being English.

==== Female athletes from all NOCs ====
After the 2008 Summer Olympics, Brunei, Qatar and Saudi Arabia were the only three NOCs that had never sent a female participant. They were put under pressure to include female athletes in their teams. All three NOCs sent female athletes to the 2012 Summer Olympics, with both Brunei and Qatar selecting female flag bearers at the Opening Ceremony. Saudi Arabia was the last NOC to select a female competitor. On 3 August 2012, the Bruneian athlete Maziah Mahusin took part in the Women's 400 metres heats and ensured that all current NOCs had at least one female participant at the Olympics.

==== Opening ceremony Munich memorial ====
As they had done prior to every Olympic Games since 1976, the remaining widows of the 11 Israeli athletes murdered by the Black September group at the 1972 Summer Olympics in Munich campaigned for the IOC to include a minute of silence during the Opening ceremony. The proposal was rejected by IOC President Jacques Rogge, who stated that his "hands were tied" by votes from 46 Arab and Muslim members admitted to the International Olympic Committee.

=== Logo ===
The design for the event logo was met with a negative response. An advertisement featuring the logo being displayed in all of its colours was reported by Epilepsy Action to have caused many people to experience epileptic seizures.

In 2011, Iran lodged a formal complaint with the International Olympic Committee after they claimed that the logo spelt the word "Zion". The complaint was dismissed by IOC President Jacques Rogge, who said that the complaint "can't be serious."

== During the games ==
=== Tape delays ===
NBC, Nine Network, and Prime TV were criticised by their viewers for tape delaying the Olympics, and making questionable editorial decisions and complicated viewing schemes.

=== Opening ceremony ===
==== Parade of Nations Gatecrasher ====
An unknown woman gatecrashed in civilian attire and was seen walking at the head of the Indian Olympic team's march past during the Parade of Nations. Her presence attracted media attention throughout India and raised questions about security at the Olympic Games. The woman was subsequently identified as Madhura Nagendra, a graduate student from Bangalore living in London and a dancer in a segment of the opening ceremony. On 31 July 2012, LOCOG issued an apology to the Indian contingent over the incident.

=== Organisational issues ===
==== Empty seats ====
Empty seats at Olympic events were reported during the first two days of the games. Although events were reported to be sold out, many empty seats were observed in highly visible areas at multiple venues. Sebastian Coe, the Head of LOCOG, stated in a press conference on 29 July that the seats were reserved for "the Olympic family and sponsors", and that the events were otherwise "stuffed to the gunwales". The empty seats were also from NOCs that had not used up the entire allocation and had not returned the unallocated tickets. Coe stated that LOCOG would investigate the claims of empty seats.

The claim that the seats were allocated to sponsors led to denials from sponsors, with British Airways stating they had returned tickets they could not distribute, and McDonald's stating that all their tickets were being used. LOCOG was able to recover some "VIP" seats that would not be used and made them available for sale. On 31 July, for example, tickets to 3,800 reclaimed seats were put on sale to the public.

The distribution of tickets was divided in the following proportions: 75% were sold to the general public, 12% went to the National Committees of participating countries for sale in their countries, 8% were for sponsors, and 5% were for the "Olympic family" (including the IOC and national Olympic organizations). It was said to be hard to anticipate if tickets given to various sponsors and Olympic officials would actually be used, and it was also difficult to reenter them into circulation at the last minute.

==== Non-public archery event ====
On Friday, 27 July, the same day as the opening ceremony but after the first sporting events outside London had started (in football), there was confusion and disappointment from some Olympic fans when they were denied access to what they thought was the first competition event in London. They had misunderstood the use by LOCOG of the phrase "non-ticketed" to mean that an archery qualification round at Lord's Cricket Ground was going to be open to the public for free, in a similar fashion to some other events like the road bike races or marathon.

In addition, some people had been sold fake tickets for the event by an illegal website. LOCOG stated:

Tickets have not been advertised or sold by LOCOG for the archery ranking event...We have always made it clear that the preliminary rounds are not open for spectators. There are a number of unofficial websites claiming to sell tickets; we therefore advise people to be extremely cautious and vigilant when attempting to buy tickets and only purchase from an official source.

==== Confusion of North Korea's and South Korea's flags ====
During the women's football tournament on the first day, 25 July, the flag of the Republic of Korea (South Korea) was mistakenly displayed on the electronic display in Hampden Park instead of that of the Democratic People's Republic of Korea (North Korea). The North Korean team walked off the pitch in protest at seeing the South Korean flag displayed by their names and refused to warm up whilst the flag was being displayed. The match between North Korea and Colombia was delayed by a little over an hour; the game then commenced after rectification of the error. LOCOG apologised for the error and said they would make efforts to ensure such a mishap did not recur; however, the organising committee's statement had to be reissued because it failed to use the nations' official titles (as used by the IOC) "Republic of Korea" and "Democratic People's Republic of Korea".

=== Competition issues ===
==== Men's 100 metres final ====
Just before the start of the Men's 100m Final, a spectator threw a plastic bottle into the lane of Tyson Gay, intended to hit Usain Bolt who was three lanes outside in Lane 7. The race was unaffected, and Bolt would go on to become the second man in history to defend a 100m Olympic title. The spectator, later identified as Ashley Gill-Webb, was soon arrested, after he was struck on the head by Dutch judoka and bronze medalist Edith Bosch, whom he happened to be sitting next to. LOCOG Chairman Sebastian Coe later stated: "I'm not suggesting vigilantism but it was actually poetic justice that they happened to be sitting next to a judo player". Gill-Webb later pleaded not guilty to a charge of using threatening words or behaviour with intent to cause harassment, alarm or distress at Stratford Magistrates' Court. He was later found guilty.

==== Men's cycling team sprint ====
On 2 August, British cyclist Philip Hindes, during an interview in the mixed zone for media immediately after the race, said that he deliberately crashed in an earlier round because he did not like the start he had. Hindes reaffirmed what he said in a BBC interview shortly after: "I just did it to get the restart. My first wasn't the greatest so I thought to get the restart." The British team later responded by claiming that it was a misunderstanding and comments were lost in translation, citing English was not German-born Hindes' first language. Hindes also retracted his original comments and said he just lost control and fell down.

In Team Sprint, cyclists are allowed a restart if they crash or have a mechanical incident. The Union Cycliste Internationale said the result of the qualifying race "was not in question," and the International Olympic Committee said it would not investigate. The French team, which came second, accepted the result, but also suggested team sprint regulation needed to be changed.

==== Men's 66 kg judo judging ====
On 29 July, in a quarter final match in the 66 kg category, South Korean judoka Cho Jun-ho received a unanimous 3–0 judging decision that he had beaten Japanese judoka Ebinuma Masashi. Almost immediately, Marius Vizer, chief of the International Judo Federation, intervened and held a meeting with the match referee and two judges. Shortly afterwards, the three officials returned to the mat and reversed their original decision by declaring Masashi the 0–3 winner. South Korean officials launched an unsuccessful appeal and the result was upheld.

==== Women's badminton doubles matches ====
A review of two matches in the Badminton Women's doubles competition played on 31 July was conducted after it appeared that, having already qualified for the knockout stages, players on both sides in each game had been attempting to lose their last group stage matches in order to gain a more favourable draw in the quarter-finals. The matches were between China's Wang Xiaoli and Yu Yang and South Korea's Jung Kyung-eun and Kim Ha-na in Group A, and South Korea's Ha Jung-eun and Kim Min-jung versus Indonesia's Meiliana Jauhari and Greysia Polii in Group C. After errors began occurring during routine shots in both matches, including shots going long and serves hitting the net, the crowd reacted badly. The match between Yu Yang and Wang Xiaoli of China and Jung Kyung and Kim Ha Na of South Korea featured no rallies of more than four shots.

In the second game, a tournament referee initially issued a black card to disqualify the players but, after the teams' coaches argued, this was rescinded; play was allowed to continue while he monitored proceedings. Both the earlier match and the later match were ultimately played to a conclusion, completing the draw for the quarter-finals (Group B and D having concluded earlier in the day). Technical delegate Paisan Rangsikitpho said after the Group A match, "If it's true what I hear, this is a shame and I don't like it. And I'm not going to accept anything that I don't like at all. It's not in a good spirit....I apologise to the public, I apologise for everyone and I am not happy."

On 1 August 2012, following the review, all eight players were ejected from the tournament by the Badminton World Federation after being found guilty of "not using best efforts" and "conducting oneself in a manner that is clearly abusive or detrimental to the sport".

==== Women's individual épée timing and appeal ====
On 30 July, South Korean fencer Shin A-Lam was involved in a prolonged controversy at the ExCeL Centre. She had appeared to beat her opponent Britta Heidemann, but an issue developed around the timing clock. After Heidemann's last unsuccessful attempt to break the tie, the referee called a "halt" to stop the bout; however, seconds later and despite the bout having been stopped, the clock continued to count down to zero. Since an overtime minute has to be fenced in its entirety, the referee followed International Fencing Federation rule t.32–3 and addressed this failure of the clock or error by the timekeeper by having the clock reset to one second, the clock's lowest possible setting. When the fencers resumed their positions, Heidemann scored the winning point.

Shin was required to sit on the piste for almost an hour, often openly sobbing, while her coaches lodged an official complaint, prompting an announcer at the venue to confirm that moving from the piste would have been seen as indicating her acceptance of the ruling against her. After losing the protest, Shin fought, and lost, against Sun Yujie of China thirty minutes later in the bronze medal match.

Shin was later offered a "special medal" by the International Fencing Federation but was not appeased by the prospect of the award, saying, "It does not make me feel better. It's not an Olympic medal". Korean Olympic Committee president Park Yung-Sung commented on the offer as saying, "they know they are very sorry about her and they have to recognise her sporting spirit".

After this incident, the rules were changed and it is now mandatory for the apparatus to show figures at the hundredths of the second starting from 10 seconds on the clock.

==== Women's cycling team sprint ====
China's cyclists, Gong Jinjie and Guo Shuang, twice set the world record, in qualifying and the first round, and finished first in the final in 32.619s. However, the team was later disqualified for an alleged "early relay" infringement and relegated to the silver medal, and the second place German team was promoted to gold. The Chinese team's coach Daniel Morelon complained that the judges refused to provide "video footage of the race in slow motion" and only provided a "vague explanation" for the infringement they had allegedly committed. He went on to proclaim that the Chinese team were "robbed" of a gold medal.

==== Men's boxing officiating ====
Referee Ishanguly Meretnyyazov was dismissed from the games after the men's 56 kg boxing Round of 16 bout between Japan's Satoshi Shimizu and Azerbaijan's Magomed Abdulhamidov. During the third round of the fight, Abdulhamidov was knocked to the canvas six times. Meretnyyazov failed to issue a standing-eight count in any of the six instances. The judges awarded the win to Abdulhamidov; a decision that was later overturned by the International Amateur Boxing Association (AIBA). The AIBA indicated that the fight should have been stopped and awarded to Shimizu after three knockdowns. Before the London Olympics, Azerbaijan had faced controversy regarding a $9 million payment to World Series Boxing, and rumors surfaced that Azerbaijan had bribed AIBA for two gold medals during the London 2012 Olympics.

German referee Frank Scharmach was suspended for five days after disqualifying Iran's Ali Mazaheri for excessive holding during his bout with Cuba's José Larduet.

In another fight, Ukrainian Evhen Khytrov, boxing world champion in 2011, was ruled to have lost to Britain's Anthony Ogogo after an 18–18 countback, despite two knockdowns. The National Olympic Committee of Ukraine protested the decision to AIBA.

Canadian Custio Clayton lost to British boxer Freddie Evans in the Welterweight quarterfinals when Evans, who was awarded the fight on a countback, was cautioned three separate times for holding during the bout but was not penalised a point for the infraction as was required by the rules. Canada appealed the decision, but AIBA instead ruled that Evans was "incorrectly cautioned" and, as a result, did not deserve any point deductions.

==== Women's football semifinal ====
During the semi-final football match between Canada and the United States, a time-wasting call was made against the Canadian goalkeeper, Erin McLeod, when she held the ball longer than the allowed six seconds. As a result, the American side was awarded an indirect free-kick in the box. On the ensuing play, Canada was penalized for a handball in the penalty box, with the American team being awarded a penalty kick, which Abby Wambach converted to tie the game at 3–3. The Americans went on to win the match in extra time, advancing to the gold medal game.

After the match, Canada forward Christine Sinclair stated, "the ref decided the result before the game started." FIFA responded by stating that the refereeing decisions were correct and saying it was considering disciplinary action against Sinclair, but that any disciplinary action would be postponed until after the end of the tournament.

==== Men's 100m breaststroke final ====
Five days after setting a new world record in the 100m breaststroke final en route to a gold medal, South African swimmer Cameron van der Burgh said that he had used illegal "dolphin kicks" while underwater after the start and turns. Van der Burgh claimed that he had to break the rule because it is done so commonly by many international breaststrokers, saying, "It's got to the point where if you're not doing it you are falling behind or giving yourself a disadvantage." There were complaints from other swimmers and swimming federations, with many calls for World Aquatics (FINA) to introduce underwater footage to help race officials, but no official protest was launched against van der Burgh, who kept his medal and record.

==== Women's 400m Individual Medley ====
After Chinese swimmer Ye Shiwen won her gold medal in the women's 400m Individual Medley, the level of her performance was questioned by various observers, including executive director of the World Swimming Coaches Association John Leonard, since she came from being behind the world record in the final 50m to beating it by 1.02 seconds. Ye Shiwen had never failed a drug test during her career and director of LOCOG Colin Moyinhan spoke in her defence, but some still considered her performance "unbelievable".

==== Men's 800m athletics heat ====
During a preliminary heat of the 800m event, Algerian runner Taoufik Makhloufi stopped running after only 200m and walked off the track. It was suggested he deliberately stopped running in order to save himself for the 1500m race the following day, where he was fancied as a medal winner, and that the Algerian officials had earlier failed in their attempts to withdraw him in time from the 800m contest. Makhloufi was dismissed from the Games by the International Association of Athletics Federations, who accused him of not giving an honest effort, violating the Olympic ideal; however, Algerian officials lodged an official protest, stating that Makhloufi withdrew from the race because of a knee injury. After being examined by doctors, Makhloufi was reinstated in time for the 1500m final. Makhloufi then won the gold medal in the 1500m race and stated, "Every person who wins a race forgets about his aches and pains".

==== Athletes' behavioural issues ====
===== Association football =====
Swiss footballer Michel Morganella was sent home by the Switzerland football team after he sent a tweet following their 2–1 loss against South Korea, saying that South Koreans "can go burn" and referred to them as a "bunch of mongoloids". Gian Gilli, the director of Swiss Olympic Committee, said that the tweet "discriminated, insulted and violated the dignity of the South Korean football team and people".

After South Korea defeated Japan in the Bronze Medal men's football match at the Millennium Stadium in Cardiff on 10 August, South Korean player Park Jong-Woo walked around the field holding a banner with a message written in Korean, "독도는 우리 땅!" (dokdo neun uri ttang, lit. 'Dokdo is our territory!'). As both IOC and FIFA statutes prohibit any political statements being made by athletes at their respective sporting events, the IOC barred Park from the bronze medal ceremony and did not permit him to receive his medal. In addition, it asked FIFA to discipline Park, and stated that it may decide on further sanctions at a later date.

FIFA failed to reach a conclusion on the case at a meeting at its Zurich headquarters held on 5 October, and the disciplinary committee discussed the case again on the following week, then failed to reach a verdict again. The case was heard again by the committee on 20 November, and FIFA decided on 3 December to suspend Park for two matches after he was considered to have breached the FIFA Disciplinary Code and the Regulations of the Olympic Football Tournaments. FIFA also imposed a warning on the Korea Football Association (KFA) and reminded it of its obligation to properly instruct its players on all the pertinent rules and applicable regulations before the start of any competition, in order to avoid such incidents in the future. The KFA was also warned that should incidents of a similar nature occur again in the future, the FIFA Disciplinary Committee may impose harsher sanctions on the KFA.

===== Swimming =====
Australian swimmers Nick D'Arcy and Kenrick Monk were originally to be sent home once the swimming programme of the Games had concluded after posting a photo on Facebook showing them posing with guns that was deemed to bring the sport into disrepute. The Australian Olympic Committee subsequently gave the pair a reprieve allowing them to stay and join family and friends for a holiday in Europe. The two were required, however, to leave the Olympic Village and surrender their Olympic accreditation after the swimming program concluded. As part of the deal, D'Arcy and Monk gave an undertaking not to engage in social media activity during the remainder of the Games.

Monk had previously attracted controversy when he admitted to lying to police when he was questioned about the cause of an accident during a training session, while D'Arcy had been removed from the Australian team for the Beijing Olympics after being charged with assault. When discussing D'Arcy's upcoming event, journalist Steve Price commented, "I don't care if he drowns".

===== Rowing =====
German rower Nadja Drygalla voluntarily left the Olympic Village on 3 August after controversy arose over her relationship with a neo-Nazi far-right politician. Drygalla's boyfriend was reportedly a leading member of the "Rostock National Socialists" and had apparently fought a state election for the far-right National Democratic Party.

Australian rower Josh Booth, who competed in the Men's eight event, was expelled from the Australian team after vandalising shops while drunk.

===== Track and Field =====
Kittian sprinter Kim Collins – who carried the flag of Saint Kitts and Nevis at the Opening Ceremony – was removed from the men's 100m sprint before the heats by the St. Kitts and Nevis Olympic Committee, reportedly after leaving the Athletes' Village without permission to spend a night in a hotel with his wife. The national Olympic committee responded, stating that Collins had repeatedly ignored attempts by officials to contact him, and did not register for his events as had been requested of him. Collins was sent home, his accreditation to access the Olympic Village having been cancelled.

==== Failure to leave the UK by Cameroonian Olympians ====
Seven Cameroonian athletes went missing while participating in the Olympics, with the head of Cameroon's Olympics delegation stating that they defected, along with some speculation that the athletes would try to seek asylum or wanted to stay in the UK for economic reasons. The missing athletes included the reserve football goalkeeper Drusille Ngako, swimmer Paul Ekane Edingue, and boxers Thomas Essomba, Christian Donfack Adjoufack, Abdon Mewoli, Blaise Yepmou Mendouo and Serge Ambomo. The five boxing team members later applied for and received asylum status to continue living in the UK.

== See also ==
- Cheating at the Paralympic Games
- Concerns and controversies over the 2008 Summer Olympics
- Concerns and controversies over the 2010 Winter Olympics
- Concerns and controversies over the 2010 Commonwealth Games
- Controversies at the 2012 Paralympic Games
- Campaign for a Scottish Olympic Team
- Parasports
