= Boosting (doping) =

Form of performance enhancement in sport

A game of wheelchair rugby, a sport where some competitors are believed to "Boost"

Boosting is a method of inducing autonomic dysreflexia with the intention of enhancing performance in sport. It can be used by an athlete with a spinal cord injury to increase their blood pressure and is performed by causing a painful stimulus in the lower part of the body. The International Paralympic Committee (IPC) banned the practice in 1994, but many competitors with spinal injuries are still thought to be using it as a performance enhancer.

== Method ==
Athletes with spinal injuries can have difficulties with autonomic functions and their bodies may be unable to control blood pressure and heart rate. Because of this their bodies do not adapt to the increased demand of physical activity. Without these changes the athlete can become fatigued and suffer from a lower level of endurance. Boosting works by tricking the body into a state of high blood pressure and heart rate, with an increased utilization of oxygen improving the athlete's performance.

Athletes who perform boosting before or during an event will often self-harm with some taking extreme measures to achieve the desired boost level. Techniques include:

- Clamping the catheter to ensure that the bladder becomes overly full
- Overly tightening leg straps
- Electric shocks or stress to the feet, legs, scrotum, or testicles
- Breaking a bone, usually in the toe.

== Effectiveness and risks ==
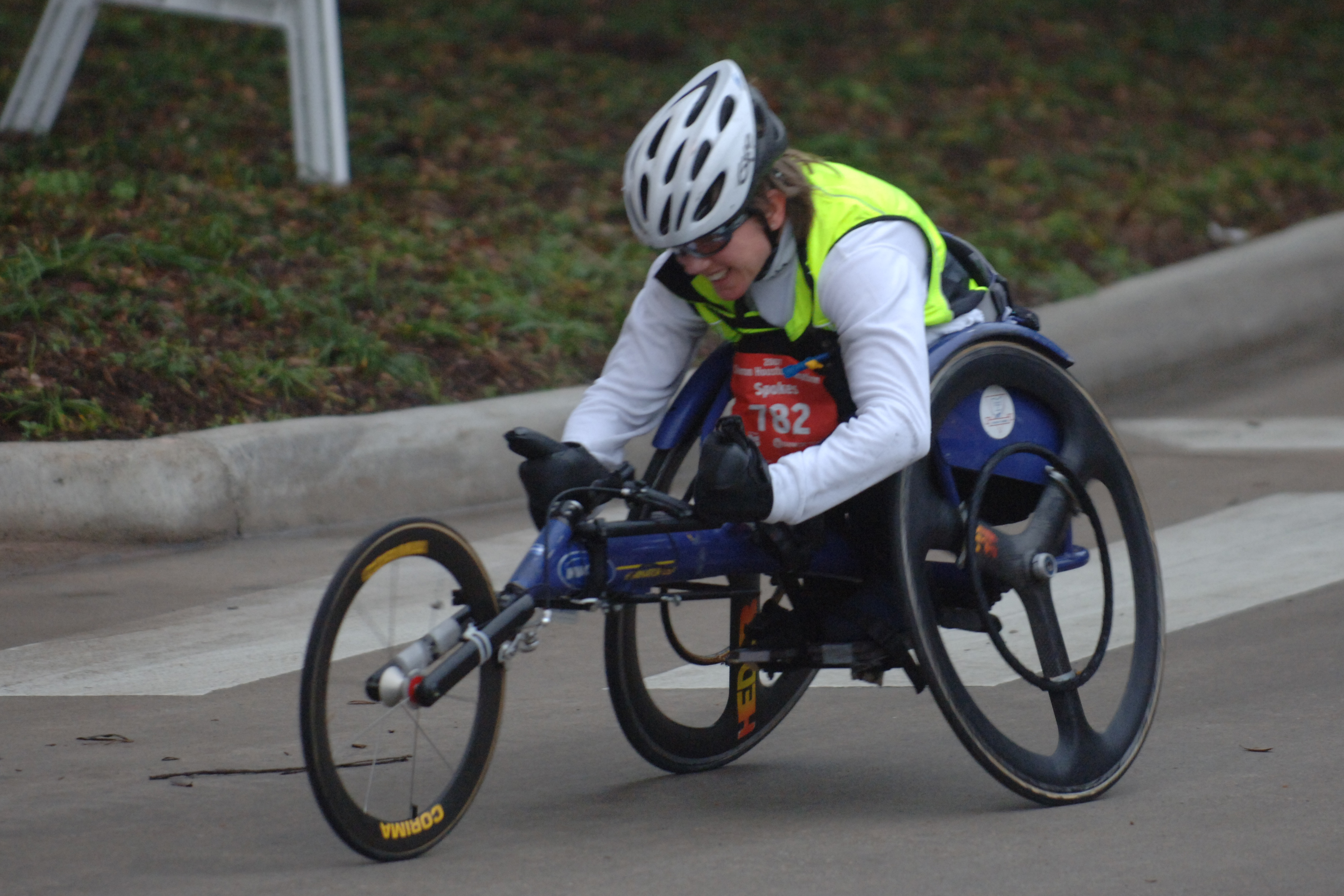
Boosting simulations were conducted on wheelchair marathon athletes in 1994 and showed that significant performance gains could be made

Boosting has been shown in simulated races to give noticeable improvements in the performance of wheelchair marathon athletes. In the 1994 study the athletes attained an average 9.7 percent improvement after their bladder had been over-distended or after sitting in the racing chair for 1–2 hours prior to competing. It is believed to be capable of enhancing performance by up to 15 percent.

There are many possible side effects of boosting, including the occurrence of a cerebrovascular or cardiovascular event such as a stroke or heart attack. Other complications include:

- aphasia
- bradycardia
- cerebral haemorrhage
- epilepsy
- hypertension
- hyperthermia
- neurological abnormalities
- visual disturbances

== Prevalence ==
The IPC conducted a survey during the 2008 Games with 99 responses. 16.7 percent of the participants indicated that they had tried boosting in training or during a competition, with more than half of them being competitors in wheelchair rugby. The use of boosting continues in athletes but is very difficult to detect. During the Games 20 athletes were tested just before their event for evidence of boosting but there were no positive results.

== IPC view ==
The IPC made boosting illegal in 1994. Their handbook states in Chapter 4.3:

An athlete with a systolic blood pressure of 180mm Hg or above will be re-examined approximately ten minutes after the first examination. If on the second examination the systolic blood pressure remains above 180mm Hg the person in charge of the examination shall inform the Technical Delegate to withdraw the athlete from the particular competition in question. Any deliberate attempt to induce Autonomic Dysreflexia is forbidden and will be reported to the Technical Delegate. The athlete will be disqualified from the particular competition regardless of the systolic blood pressure.

== See also ==
- Cheating at the Paralympic Games
