= 2012 Olympics one minute of silence campaign =

The 2012 Olympics one minute of silence campaign refers to an international campaign created to persuade the International Olympic Committee (IOC) to hold one minute of silence at the opening ceremony of the 2012 London Olympics to remember the Israeli athletes killed in the Munich massacre at the 1972 Olympics by the Palestinian terrorist organisation Black September. Support for the campaign came from a number of high-ranking officials and governments, including the United States Congress, U.S. president Barack Obama, U.S. secretary of state Hillary Clinton, U.S. Republican Party presidential candidate Mitt Romney, the Italian Parliament, the Australian Parliament, the Canadian Parliament, the German Parliament, and German foreign minister Guido Westerwelle.

The IOC declined the request for a minute of silence at the opening ceremony, but IOC officials honoured the victims at a ceremony organised by the Israeli embassy and the Jewish community in London during the Olympics on August 6, 2012. A further ceremony was planned in Germany on the anniversary of the attack on September 5, 2012 at the military airfield of Fürstenfeldbruck. IOC president Rogge led a spontaneous minute of silence during a ceremony on July 23, 2012 which promoted the Olympic truce, marking the first time ever that the IOC honoured the Israeli victims in a ceremony inside an Olympic village.

== Background ==
The Munich massacre occurred during the 1972 Summer Olympics in Munich, in southern West Germany, when members of the Israeli Olympic team were taken hostage and eventually murdered by the Palestinian group Black September. The kidnappers killed eleven Israeli athletes and coaches, as well as a West German police officer.

Following the attack, a memorial service was held in the Olympic Stadium, although the International Olympic Committee (IOC) President Avery Brundage did not refer to the athletes during his speech. Since the memorial, the IOC has repeatedly rejected calls to commemorate the victims during the Olympics or hold an official memorial service.

== Initial attempts ==
The families of the murdered athletes have attempted since the massacre to receive official remembrance for those killed in the massacre, starting with the Montreal Olympics in 1976.

Ankie Spitzer, the widow of Israeli coach Andrei Spitzer, has helped lead the campaign, and has described the idea of a minute of silence or other form of commemoration as "natural in our [the families'] eyes." However, Spitzer said,

But they told us very clearly: "There are 21 Arab delegations that will leave if we say something about the Israeli athletes." So I said: "Let them leave if they can't understand what the Olympics are all about – a connection between people through sport."

Since the Montreal Olympics, the IOC has continued to reject any official commemoration of the victims. Spitzer explained that the International Olympic Committee says it is not in the "protocol of the opening ceremony to have a commemoration." However, Spitzer said, "Well, my husband coming home in a coffin was not in the protocol either. This was the blackest page in Olympic history. These 11 athletes were part of the Olympic family, they were not accidental tourists. They should be remembered as part of the Olympic framework."

== Campaign ==
In April 2012, the year of the 40th anniversary of the Munich massacre, an online petition was created titled "Tell the International Olympic Committee: 40 Years is Enough!", to urge the International Olympic Committee to honour the memory of the eleven murdered athletes in one minute of silence. The Jewish Community Center of Rockland County, New York, initiated the petition with Ankie Spitzer, the wife of Andrei Spitzer, who was killed at the Munich Olympics. The petition says, "Just one minute — at the 2012 London Summer Olympics and at every Olympic Games, to promote peace." When the London Olympics took place in July, over 100,000 people had signed the petition in support of one minute of silence.

Later during the same month, Israeli Deputy Foreign Minister Danny Ayalon wrote an official letter to the International Olympic Committee, in which he requested the commemoration of the eleven murdered athletes in a minute of silence, as well as an emphasis on the Olympic principles of equality and brotherhood. Ayalon said, "We must remain vigilant against acts of hate and intolerance that stand in contrast to the ideals of the international Olympics."

== Support ==
Support for the one minute of silence campaign for the London 2012 Olympics emerged from across the globe. Calls for a minute of silence also came from various parliaments and government officials. In addition, over 100,000 people signed a petition in support of one minute of silence.

=== Australia ===
Prime Minister Julia Gillard, Deputy Prime Minister Wayne Swan, Foreign Minister Bob Carr, opposition leader Tony Abbott, New South Wales Premier Barry O'Farrell, Victorian Premier Ted Baillieu, and federal lawmakers Michael Danby and Josh Frydenberg signed a letter urging the International Olympic Committee to hold one minute of silence. The letter said, "Silence is a fitting tribute for the athletes who lost their lives on the Olympic stage. Silence contains no statements, assumptions or beliefs and requires no understanding of language to interpret."

Australian lawmakers unanimously supported a motion that supported a minute of silence during the opening ceremony of the London Olympics. Prime Minister Julia Gillard and opposition leader Tony Abbot voted for the motion as well. The motion said that the impact of 1972 Munich Massacre "has been seared on world consciousness" and urged the International Olympic Committee to commemorate the 40th anniversary.

=== Canada ===
The House of Commons unanimously adopted a motion by Liberal Member of Parliament Irwin Cotler to support the campaign for a special tribute for the victims of the Munich Massacre.

Minister of State for Sport Bal Gosal and Minister of Foreign Affairs John Baird urged IOC president Jacques Rogge to reconsider his position against commemorating the victims. They wrote, "The terrorist attack targeted not only Israel, but the spirit and goals of the Olympic movement. Given the impact of this tragedy, on the Olympic community as a whole and the world, it should be marked publicly as part of the official ceremony of the games, not just by the Israeli delegation."

=== Germany ===
Foreign Minister Guido Westerwelle supported a minute of silence at the London Olympics in a letter to Jacques Rogge, the president of the International Olympic Committee. Westerwelle wrote that the Munich Massacre was "also an attack on the Olympic Games and the Olympic idea of promoting peace and friendship among the nations." Westerwelle recognised that the focus of the Olympics must be the sports competition, but also appealed to Rogge for "a moment's pause at an appropriate time" during the Olympics, which would be "a humanitarian gesture and a fitting way to send the message that violence and terror are incompatible with the Olympic idea." Westerwelle added that Germany "looks back with grief and anguish on the tragedy of Munich" and their thoughts are with the victims, their families, and the Israeli team members who survived.

Parliament President Norbert Lammert pledged his support for one minute of silence in an official letter to Israel's Knesset Speaker Reuven Rivlin. Rivlin said, "That Germany, on whose territory the terrorist attacks were carried out, joined the cause is extremely significant." "The case for a minute of silence to mark the 40th anniversary of the massacre is a moral cause of the first order."

=== United Kingdom ===
The London Assembly unanimously agreed on a motion that called on Mayor Boris Johnson to ensure that the victims of the 1972 Munich Massacre are remembered during the 2012 Games with a minute of silence in the Olympic Park during the opening or closing ceremonies. The motion said:

This Assembly notes the widespread, cross-party, support for one minute's silence during the London Olympic Games to mark the 10th Olympiad since and 40th anniversary of the terrorist massacre of Israeli competitors and their coaches during the 1972 Munich Olympics. This Assembly urges the Mayor of London to use his position and influence to ensure an official minute's silence remembrance is observed in the Olympic Park during the Opening or Closing Ceremonies of the London Olympic Games.

Andrew Dismore AM proposed the motion and said, "It is 40 years since this terrible attack took place and there has not once been a memorial service or event officially part of the scheduled events at Olympic Games. This is simply not good enough. The IOC say to have a minute's silence to commemorate these victims of terrorism would be a 'political gesture' but surely not having a minute's silence is, in itself, the political gesture. This is not about the nationality of the victims – they were Olympians." Roger Evans AM seconded the motion and said, "The IOC needs to show some political courage and allow the commemoration of a tragedy that affected their guests during their event in their venue forty years ago. This important decision should not be dictated by a small number of their members."

=== Italy ===
Approximately 140 members of Italy's parliament urged the International Olympic Committee to observe one minute of silence on the 40th anniversary of the Munich Massacre in a letter they wrote to the IOC.

=== United States ===
The United States Senate unanimously passed a resolution which urged the International Olympic Committee to hold one minute of silence. The United States House of Representatives unanimously passed a similar bill brought by the United States House Committee on Foreign Affairs, but the full body did not receive a chance to vote on it. The House of Representatives held a moment of silence themselves, and one-minute speeches were given on the House floor as well. Representative Eliot Engel, who cosponsored the resolution in support of a minute of silence, blamed the IOC's refusal on "being political because frankly they’re afraid of offending some of the Arab nations." However, Engel said, "If you have this fiction of fraternal bonds and commonality of feeling, then it's appropriate for the IOC to act without any politics whatsoever. The only reason they haven’t done this in 40 years is because it's Israeli athletes, and that makes it even more disgraceful."

President Barack Obama said that he "absolutely" supports a minute of silence. National Security Council spokesman Tommy Vietor said "We absolutely support the campaign for a minute of silence at the Olympics to honor the Israeli athletes killed in Munich."

United States Secretary of State Hillary Clinton wrote to the International Olympic Committee President Jacques Rogge to urge the IOC to hold an "appropriate memorial event" in London for the victims of the Munich massacre, and urged the IOC to reverse their decision against holding a minute of silence.

Republican presidential candidate, Governor Mitt Romney, supported one minute of silence. Andrea Saul, a spokeswoman for Mitt Romney, said, "Governor Romney supports the moment of silence in remembrance of the Israeli athletes killed in the Munich Olympic Games."

== International Olympic Committee response ==
The International Olympic Committee refused to hold one minute of silence at the 40th anniversary of the Munich massacre. IOC president Jacques Rogge said that, "We feel that the opening ceremony is an atmosphere that is not fit to remember such a tragic incident." However, Rogge said that the IOC would honour the victims of the Munich massacre at a reception in London during the Olympics on August 6, and that IOC officials would attend a ceremony in Germany on the anniversary of the attack on September 5 at the military airfield of Fürstenfeldbruck, where most of the Israelis died during a botched rescue attempt. Rogge also said that he has attended several ceremonies with the Israeli Olympic Committee and Israeli athletes during recent games.

Despite the refusal to honour the victims during the opening ceremony of the Olympics, on July 23 IOC president Jacques Rogge led a minute of silence during a ceremony which promoted the Olympic truce. This was the first time that the IOC honoured the Israeli victims in a ceremony inside an Olympic village. Rogge started by "honoring the memory of the 11 Israeli Olympians who shared the ideals that have brought us together in this beautiful Olympic village" and said that the Israelis "came to Munich in the spirit of peace and solidarity." Rogge added, "we owe it to them to keep that spirit alive and to remember them." In response to Rogge's spontaneous minute of silence, Ilana Romano, the widow of Israeli weightlifter Yossef Romano, said, "He is trying to do the bare minimum," and called it "shameful." Ankie Spitzer, the widow of Israeli coach Andrei Spitzer, also criticised Rogge, saying, "This is not the right solution, to hold some ceremony in front of 30 or 40 people. We asked for a moment of silence at the opening ceremony, not for someone to mumble something in front of a few dozen people." At the London commemoration on August 6, Romano told Rogge he had "submitted to terrorism", and would be "written down on the pages of history as ... a president who violated the Olympic charter calls for brotherhood, friendship and peace." Their attacks were applauded by the audience, but afterwards some attendees privately expressed discomfort at the sustained attack on Rogge, and Andrew Gilbert, formerly chair of Limmud International tweeted that "the memorial service for Munich 11 became an anti-IOC rally and heavy-handed humiliation of Rogge".'

=== Reactions to IOC response ===
Jibril Rajoub, the president of the Palestine Olympic Committee, thanked Jacques Rogge in a letter for refusing to hold a minute of silence, saying that it promotes the "spread of racism" and that the Palestinian Olympic team was prepared to "confront the Israeli provocations," referring to a minute of silence. Rajoub added that "sport in Palestine is a means to achieve national goals" as well as "a tool of struggle to present the Palestinian cause," and that "sports are a bridge to love, interconnection, and spreading of peace among nations." Al-Hayat al-Jadida, the official daily newspaper of the Palestinian National Authority referred to the Munich massacre as "the Munich Operation." Israeli Deputy Foreign Minister Danny Ayalon denounced the use of the term "racist" by Rajoub, and insisted that the murder of the Israeli Olympians due to their nationality was the racist act.

Ankie Spitzer and Ilana Romano urged members of the crowd to stand for a spontaneous minute of silence during the opening ceremony. Spitzer claimed that Rogge was using a Munich ceremony organised by the Israelis and the London Jewish community on August 6 as an excuse not to hold the moment of silence. Spitzer said, "Jacques Rogge is using it as a hideaway. If the Israeli embassy and London Jewish community were not organizing it, he would not have any memorial to go to."

When the Israeli delegation entered the Olympic Stadium, NBC sportscaster Bob Costas noted that the International Olympic Committee denied the requests for a minute of silence, saying in an interview that "many people find that denial more than puzzling but insensitive." During the opening ceremony, Costas referred to the spontaneous minute of silence the week before as insufficient, saying, "Still, for many, tonight with the world watching is the true time and place to remember those who were lost and how and why they died."

Congressman Eliot Engel condemned the IOC's refusal, saying, "Shame on you!" Joseph Potasnik, vice-president of the New York board of rabbis, said, "37,360: these are the number of minutes in the entire Olympics and they didn't find one."

Barbara Berger, whose brother David Mark Berger was killed in the Munich massacre, felt dismayed and offended at the rejection, explaining that "A moment of silence may not seem like much. But to us, to the families who lost so much, that silent respect will speak volumes." Such a moment:

would not just be a memorial for Israel; it would be a memorial for all Olympians. Our children and brothers, the Munich 11, were not only children of Israel, but children of the Olympics. They embodied the Olympic spirit of teamwork and community, of honest competition and our common humanity. They were integral embers in the flame of the Olympic torch. They were killed only because of who they were: Jews, Israelis, champions of the Jewish state.

Aly Raisman, a Jewish-American gymnast who won a gold medal at the 2012 London Olympics, expressed her support for a minute of silence at the Olympics, saying that, "The fact it was on the 40th anniversary is special, and winning the gold today means a lot to me. If there had been a moment's silence, I would have supported it and respected it."

On August 9, Irwin Cotler, a former Canadian justice minister and attorney-general and a then-member of Parliament, wrote a last-minute plea to Rogge to hold a minute of silence at the closing ceremony of the Olympics. Cotler wrote:

The refusal of the IOC to observe a moment of silence on the 40th anniversary of the Munich massacre – the slaughter of 11 Israeli athletes and coaches for no other reason than that they were Israelis and Jews – is as offensive as it is incomprehensible.

It is not hard to infer that not only were the athletes killed because they were Israeli and Jewish, but that the moment of silence is being denied them also because they are Israeli and Jewish.

These 11 Israeli Olympians were part of the Olympic family, they were murdered as members of the Olympic family, they should be remembered by the Olympic family at these Olympic Games themselves.

Cotler said that the IOC's "steadfast reluctance" to hold a minute of silence ignores and mocks "the calls for a moment of silence by Government leaders... and the sustained international public campaign and anguished civil society appeals." Cotler also mentioned that such a memorial would not be unprecedented, mentioning the minute of silence observed in memory of the Georgian athlete Nodar Kumaritashvili in the 2010 Winter Olympics; the 2002 Winter Olympics' memorialisation of the victims of 9/11; and the 2012 Summer Olympics' memorialisation of the victims of the 7 July 2005 London bombings, which happened the day after London was awarded the games. Cotler noted that neither of the last two terrorist attacks he mentioned were connected to the Olympics.

== Non-IOC commemorations ==
On July 25, 2012, the Italian Chamber of Deputies held a minute of silence to mark the 40th anniversary of the Munich massacre and in honour of the victims of the massacre. On July 29, members of the Italian Olympic delegation also held a moment of silence. Those in attendance consisted of approximately 30 individuals, as well as the Italian Tourism and Sports Minister Piero Gnudi, the head of the Italian Olympic Committee Gianni Petrucci, the chairman of the Israeli Olympic Committee Zvi Varshaviak, and the head of the Israeli delegation Efraim Zinger.

On July 27, 2012, over 20,000 people throughout London attended a "Minute for Munich" program organised by the British Zionist Federation. On the same day, a memorial was held in Trafalgar Square that was attended by approximately 400 people to commemorate the 40th anniversary of Munich massacre. The event, organised by the British Israel Coalition, was "a response to the International Olympic Committee's sustained refusal to include a minute of silence in the opening ceremony due to be held tonight."

British Prime Minister David Cameron agreed to attend a commemoration at Guildhall to mark the 40th anniversary of the Munich massacre and in honour of the victims of the massacre. Prime Minister Cameron said, "It's right that in 2012 – 40 years on from the Munich Olympics – we remember the Israeli team members who were killed there."

Israelis marked the 40th anniversary of the Munich massacre in London, during which prayers were read for the 11 murdered Israelis, wreaths were laid, and a plaque was unveiled approximately four miles from the Olympic Stadium. London Mayor Boris Johnson attended the event, and recalled watching the massacre in 1972 unfold when he was 8 years old. Johnson said, "What sticks in my mind is that sense of sacrilege and a feeling of horror that the world's greatest sporting event should suffer such an attack, and that an attack should be mounted against people who had been training for what should have been the greatest event in their lives. And I think the world watched with a sense of numb disbelief as those events unfolded because sport should transcend politics." In addition, Israeli TV commentators held an informal 30-second silence during the Olympics opening ceremony.

On July 31, a minute of silence was held aboard an EasyJet flight from London to Israel as their aeroplane flew over Munich, Germany. The captain of the flight agreed to a request from the passengers to hold a minute of silence, and asked passengers to do so.

A memorial ceremony was held on August 6, organised by the National Olympic Committee of Israel, the embassy of Israel in London, and the Jewish Committee for the London Games. IOC president Jacques Rogge, British Prime Minister David Cameron, London mayor Boris Johnson, Israeli Sports and Culture Minister Limor Livnat and other representatives attended the ceremony. A message of support was read from Charles, the Prince of Wales. Prime Minister Cameron said:

It is right that we should stop and remember the 11 Israeli athletes who so tragically lost their lives when those values came under attack in Munich 40 years ago. It was a truly shocking act of evil. A crime against the Jewish people. A crime against humanity. A crime the world must never forget.

Cameron also recalled the 7 July 2005 London bombings, and that Britain too had suffered from terrorism. Livnat said that "not observing a silence grants a moral victory to the evil." Ankie Spitzer said "Is the IOC only interested in power and money and politics? Did they forget that they are supposed to promote peace, brotherhood and fair play?" Spitzer and Ilana Romana, who had previously requested that Rogge be banned from the ceremony, said that the IOC had discriminated against the dead athletes because they were Israelis and Jews. They added that they were personally hurt and felt insulted by Rogge. Spitzer exclaimed, "Shame on you!" in reference to IOC president Rogge for refusing to hold one minute of silence.

US gymnast and gold medal winner at the 2012 London Olympics, Aly Raisman, who won her gold on the floor exercise to the music of Hava Nagila, while the music was not chosen specifically with the Munich 11 in mind, she said she would have supported and respected a moment of silence in tribute.

At the JCC Maccabi Games opening ceremonies at the JCC Rockland in suburban New York, Ankie Spitzer will lead a livestreamed, worldwide minute of silence to honour the 11 Israeli athletes who were killed in the Munich massacre.

== See also ==
- 2012 Summer Olympics
- 2012 Summer Olympics opening ceremony
- 2020 Summer Olympics opening ceremony, the first time in history where a moment of silence that observed the Munich massacre happened in the opening ceremony.
- Controversies at the 2012 Summer Olympics
- Munich massacre
