= Cheating at the Paralympic Games =

Cheating at the Paralympic Games has caused scandals that have significantly changed the way in which the International Paralympic Committee (IPC) manages the events.

Testing for performance-enhancing drugs has become increasingly strict and more widespread throughout the Games, with powerlifting seeing the most positive results. Competitors without disabilities have also competed in some Paralympic Games, with the Spanish entry in the intellectually disabled basketball tournament at the 2000 Summer Paralympics being the most notorious. It has been considered that intentionally misrepresenting a disability classification is as serious as drug use.

== Classification misrepresentation ==
Concerns of athlete cheating by misrepresenting their classifications have been raised over time, by various other athletes including swimmer Jessica Long in 2016, and wheelchair racer Tanni Grey-Thompson in 2017. Intentional misrepresentation may provide a competitive advantage to athletes to improve chances of medal winning. In 2017, the International Paralympic Committee (IPC) defended their classification system as "robust".

At the Tokyo 2020 Paralympic Games, discus thrower Vinod Kumar was banned for two years after being found to have intentionally misrepresented his abilities.

In 2023, the former head of the IPC stated there were Paralympic athletes who deliberately exaggerated the level of the impairments. With a risk to Games credibility (and income), the IPC commenced reviewing their athlete classification code in 2021, which is expected to take three years. Both the chair of the Para Badminton Athletes' Commission and the World Para Swimming classification advisor indicated there was little chance of athletes getting sanctioned for intentional misrepresentation. In July 2023, one athlete launched a lawsuit against the IPC, that instead of just national and international sporting bodies, athletes would be able to challenge the classification of athletes believed to be mispresenting their impairments.

== Doping ==
The first positive results came in the 1992 Barcelona Games with five athletes found to have used banned substances. The 2000 Sydney Games saw fourteen athletes return a positive test, ten of which were in the powerlifting competition.

The Paralympics have also been tainted by steroid use. At the 2008 Games in Beijing, three powerlifters and a German basketball player were banned after having tested positive for banned substances. This was a decrease in comparison to the ten powerlifters and one track athlete who were banned from the 2000 Games. German skier Thomas Oelsner became the first Winter Paralympian to test positive for steroids. He had won two gold medals at the 2002 Winter Paralympics, but his medals were stripped after his positive drug test. At the 2010 Winter Paralympics in Vancouver, Swedish curler Glenn Ikonen tested positive for a banned substance and was suspended for six months by the IPC. He was removed from the rest of the curling competition but his team was allowed to continue. The 54-year-old curler said his doctor had prescribed a medication on the banned substances list.

The Sydney 2000 Doping Control Program had the responsibility of ensuring that the games met the International Paralympic Medical and Anti-Doping Code and, for the first time in the sport, out-of-competition (OOC) testing was introduced. This meant that the testing window was much wider, with any competitor being called for a test at any point throughout the Games.

Nine powerlifters returned positive results before the competition and were promptly ejected. One further powerlifter and an athlete gave positive results after winning medals.

In the Salt Lake City Winter Paralympics in 2002 German cross country skier Thomas Oelsner gave a positive result after winning two gold medals. He was suspended for two years from all IPC events.

Another form of doping is "boosting", used by athletes with a spinal cord injury to induce autonomic dysreflexia and increase blood pressure. This was banned by the IPC in 1994 but is still an ongoing problem in the sport.

Another potential concern is the use of gene therapy among Paralympic athletes. All Paralympic athletes are banned from enhancing their abilities through gene doping, but it is extremely difficult to differentiate these concepts. The World Anti-Doping Agency is currently researching both gene doping and gene therapy, in part to discern the boundary between the two closely related concepts.

=== Doping in Russia ===
Having sent samples for forensic analysis, the International Paralympic Committee (IPC) found evidence that the Disappearing Positive Methodology was in operation at the 2014 Winter Paralympics in Sochi. On 7 August 2016, the IPC's Governing Board voted unanimously to ban the entire Russian team from the 2016 Summer Paralympics, citing the Russian Paralympic Committee's inability to enforce the IPC's Anti-Doping Code and the World Anti-Doping Code which is "a fundamental constitutional requirement". IPC President Sir Philip Craven stated that the Russian government had "catastrophically failed its Para athletes". IPC Athletes' Council Chairperson Todd Nicholson said that Russia had used athletes as "pawns" in order to "show global prowess".

== Intellectual disability ==
In the 1996 Atlanta Games athletes with intellectual disabilities were allowed to participate for the first time with full medal status.

=== Basketball controversy ===
Spain was stripped of their intellectual disability basketball gold medals shortly after the 2000 Summer Paralympics in Sydney closed, after Carlos Ribagorda, a member of the victorious team and an undercover journalist, revealed to the Spanish business magazine Capital that most of his colleagues had not undergone medical tests to ensure that they had a disability. The IPC investigated the claims and found that the required mental tests, which should show that the competitors have an IQ of no more than 75, were not conducted by the Spanish Paralympic Committee (CPE). Ribagorda alleged that some Spanish participants in the table tennis, track and field, and swimming events were also not disabled, meaning that five medals had been won fraudulently.

He went on to say that the Spanish Federation of Sportspeople with the Intellectually Disabilities (FEDDI) deliberately chose to sign up athletes who were not intellectually disabled to "win medals and gain more sponsorship". Fernando Martin Vicente, president of the FEDDI and vice-president of CPE, initially denied the allegations. After it was confirmed that 10 of the 12 competitors in the winning team were not disabled, Martin Vicente publicly apologised for the error and accepted total responsibility, resigning just before the findings were officially released.

Two weeks later the team was officially disqualified and was ordered to return the gold medals.

==== IPC reaction ====
The IPC announced that, due to serious difficulties in determining the eligibility of athletes, it was suspending all official sporting activities involving an intellectual disability. The IPC attempted to develop a revised system for testing for intellectual disabilities but announced on 1 February 2003 that all events involving learning difficulties would be abandoned for the 2004 Summer Paralympics in Athens.

Following an anti-corruption drive, the International Sports Federation for Persons with an Intellectual Disability (INAS-FID) lobbied to have these athletes reinstated. Beginning in 2004, athletes with an intellectual disability began to be re-integrated into Paralympic sport competitions. The IPC stated that it would re-evaluate their participation following the Beijing 2008 Paralympic Games. In November 2009 the ban was lifted and the IPC introduced a series of "sports intelligence" tests to confirm claimed disabilities. The first IPC-run event where intellectual disability athletes were allowed to compete again was the 2009 IPC Swimming European Championships.

== List of stripped Paralympic medals ==
Paralympics	Athlete	Country	Medal	Event	Ref
2002 Winter Paralympics	Thomas Oelsner	Germany	(gold) gold	7.5 km biathlon	
2002 Winter Paralympics	Thomas Oelsner	Germany	(gold) gold	5 km classic cross country	
2000 Summer Paralympics	Spain Men's Basketball Team	Spain	(gold) gold	Basketball ID	

== See also ==
- Controversies at the 2012 Summer Paralympics
