= Concerns and controversies at the 2008 Summer Olympics =

A number of concerns and controversies surfaced before, during, and after the 2008 Summer Olympics, and which received major media coverage.

Leading up to the Olympics, there were concerns about human rights in China, such that many high-profile individuals, such as politicians and celebrities, announced intentions to boycott the games to protest China's role in the Darfur conflict, the unrest in Myanmar, its stance towards Tibet, and other aspects of its human rights record. Foreign journalists at the games reportedly faced various restrictions to their work, limitations to internet access, and threats of physical violence. Beijing was also under a high alert during the games because of security concerns following civil unrest in Tibet and terrorist attacks by Xinjiang separatists.

The levels of air pollution in Beijing came under intense scrutiny, due both to concerns about athletes' health and concerns that Beijing had failed to live up to promises it made during its Olympic bid.

The gymnastics competition caused a major worldwide controversy during and after the games when some Chinese gymnasts were accused of being under the minimum age, but then cleared after an investigation. Other controversies surrounding the 2008 Summer Olympics included ticketing problems, displacement of Beijing residents due to construction and demolitions, and alleged persecution of individuals applying to protest.

== Organizing concerns and controversies ==
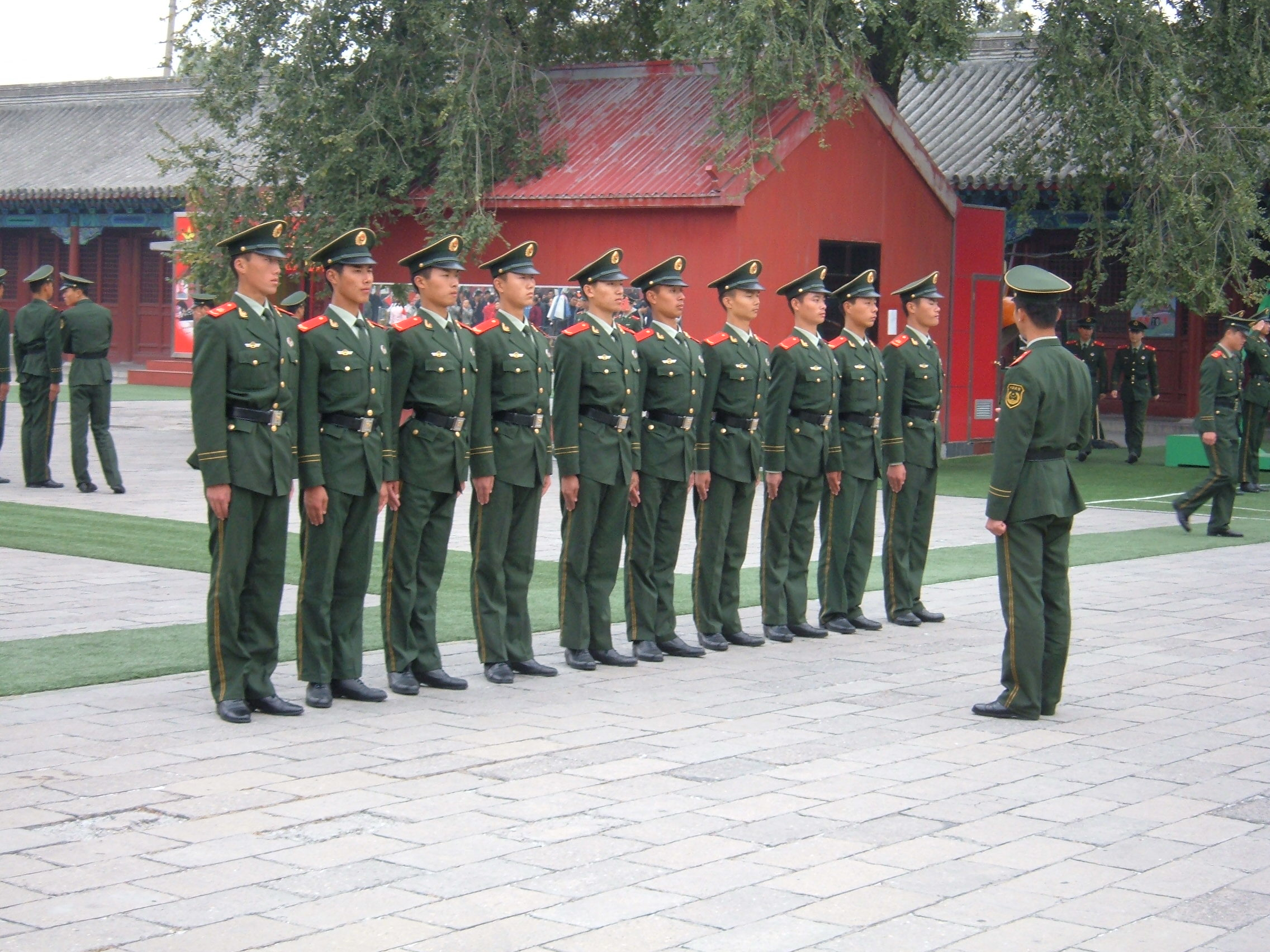
A People's Armed Police squad in Beijing

=== Security ===
During the run-up to the 2008 Beijing Olympics the Chinese state placed additional emphasis on wéiwěn (维稳; "stability maintenance") which led to an intensification of repression across the country. Some within the Party warned that increased action to combat instability which might not even exist could lead to a spiral of repression and unrest.

In April, non-Chinese in Beijing reported more regular checks of their identification and work permits, while travel agents in Hong Kong reported that multiple-entry business visas for the mainland, commonly used by non-Chinese businessmen who lack work visas, were no longer being issued, apparently in an attempt to prevent the entry of non-Chinese activists.

Increased security was put into place for the Olympics, and security personnel were trained to counter different terrorist attack scenarios. Anti-aircraft missiles were also installed over the Olympic stations in Beijing. The Times reported that China had mobilised 110,000 police and other security forces in Beijing itself, plus 1.4 million security volunteers and 300,000 surveillance volunteers. The security bill for Beijing alone was estimated in excess of £3 billion. Outside the capital, cities hosting Olympic events were patrolled by 34,000 troops, surface-to-air missiles guarded key sites, and 74 military aircraft, 48 helicopters, and 33 naval vessels were placed on high alert.

Hong Kong's South China Morning Post (SCMP) reported that bar owners in the Sanlitun district of Beijing were ordered by police officials not to serve "black people or Mongolians" as well as, in one case, to lay off two staff members who were ethnic Tibetan for the Olympics. Liam Fitzpatrick said in a Time magazine article that the report by the SCMP was "unconfirmed", and its information was from "anonymous" sources. Equally, The Washington Post interviewed several black bar patrons in Sanlitun, all of whom said they had not been denied service. China's official news agency Xinhua stated on 21 July the alleged "bar policy" was groundless and the city's public security departments, including Sanlitun police, never demanded any bar not serve customers from any region or country ahead of the games.

==== Professionalism and etiquette ====
The Beijing government issued new mandates requiring police officers in the city to act more professionally, warning that violators would be reprimanded. By doing this, Beijing hoped to clean up its image in time for the games. The government circulated pamphlets urging officers to desist from using foul language, being arrogant, and hanging up on people who call to report crimes.

A drive was also launched to improve incorrect English translations common on Chinese signage and labelling in readiness for the Olympics. Signs were placed around Beijing, instructing locals not to ask any non-Chinese personal questions for fear of causing discomfort to tourists and athletes.

=== Opening ceremony ===
==== Firework display ====
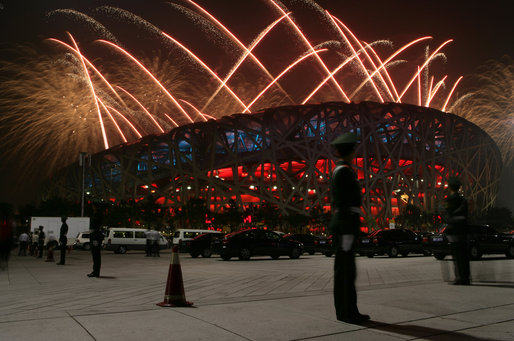
Beijing National Stadium during the opening ceremony

One part of the fireworks show, which displayed the 29 footprints that wandered into the Bird's Nest from outside the stadium, was simulated by computer animation to portray the real fireworks due to the hazy smog conditions and safety concerns with flying a helicopter near the display.

==== Catholic Cardinal not invited ====
Hong Kong Bishop John Tong Hon said of his acceptance to participate in the opening ceremony that "while the leaders of the six largest religions in Hong Kong were invited to Beijing, only in the case of the Catholic Church was an invitation not sent to the highest authority. I am embarrassed because our government ignored Cardinal Zen and invited me instead." He expressed his desire that China's government would someday give "the same importance to greater religious and social freedom that it had in cleaning up Beijing's pollution in anticipation of the games," nonetheless noting that "the Olympic Games [still showed] the progress of China".

==== Singing ====
Ode to the Motherland, sometimes called "the second national anthem" of the PRC, was lipsynched by Lin Miaoke. The song actually broadcast was a recording of another girl, Yang Peiyi. Chen Qigang, the ceremony's chief musical director, claimed that this was because a senior Politburo member had commented that Lin's singing was not good enough, but preferred Lin's appearance to that of Yang. Sun Weide, the spokesman for the Beijing organising committee, said however that the decision to use both girls was made by the artistic director after consulting with broadcasters, who had recommended the change.

== Athlete issues ==
A number of sportsmen were criticised for their behaviour at the games:

- The Chinese men's football team was severely criticised by the domestic media for its poor sportsmanship, particularly during the match against Belgium. Defender Tan Wangsong was red-carded for kicking Belgium's Sébastien Pocognoli in the lower abdomen, while Zheng Zhi was sent off for elbowing an opponent.
- Mohammad Alirezaei of Iran was to race against Israel's Tom Be'eri in the fourth heat of the 100 meter breaststroke, but pulled out, allegedly under the orders from officials of the Iranian delegation for political reasons.
- Swedish wrestler Ara Abrahamian refused his bronze medal in 84 kg Greco-Roman wrestling in protest over the judging of a semifinal match.
- Cuban taekwondo athlete Ángel Valodia Matos kicked referee Chakir Chelbat in the mouth, leaving him needing seven stitches for a cut lip, after being ruled to have retired when an injury timeout (Kyeshi) expired. Afterwards, Matos punched a judge in the arm and spat on the arena floor before he and his coach, who accused the referee of taking bribes from Kazakhstan officials, were escorted from the arena by security. Matos' results at the Beijing Games were deleted, and the World Taekwondo Federation banned Matos and his coach from WTF events for life.
- Chinese taekwondo judges were accused of throwing a match to a weaker opponent so that the Chinese competitor in the next match would win.

=== Photos of the Spanish basketball team ===
The Spanish basketball team posing with 'slit-eyes'

Prior to the start of the Games, the Spanish Men's and Women's Basketball teams featured in ads that appeared in the Spanish daily sports newspaper Diario Marca. The athletes, dressed in uniform and assembled at a center court bearing a dragon logo, posed with their hands pulling back the skin on their eyes. The Guardian said: "No one involved in the advert appears to have considered it inappropriate nor contemplated the manner in which it could be interpreted in China and elsewhere." A spokesman for the Organization of Chinese Americans said that the photo was "clearly racist, and not even in a jovial way". Point guard Jose Manuel Calderon said the team was responding to a request from the photographer, while teammate Pau Gasol said it was "absurd" people were calling the gesture racist. The IOC said "clearly it was inappropriate, we understand the team has apologised and absolutely meant no offence whatsoever", and considered the matter closed.

=== FIFA v football clubs dispute ===
In July 2008, the football clubs representing players taking part in the games, FC Schalke 04, SV Werder Bremen and FC Barcelona, made an appeal to the Court of Arbitration for Sport to prevent their star players, namely Brazilian players Rafinha and Diego and Argentinian player Lionel Messi respectively, from playing at the Olympics. Originally, FIFA's rule states that it was mandatory to release all players aged 23 or under for the Olympics on July 30, 2008. However, FIFA's order was overturned entirely on August 6, 2008, stating that "The Olympic Football Tournament Beijing 2008 is not included in the Co-ordinated Match Calendar and there is no specific decision of the FIFA Executive Committee establishing the obligation for the clubs to release players under 23 for this tournament." This meant clubs were entitled to recall their players from the games if they wished.

Despite the ruling, FIFA appealed to the club, Rafinha and Diego was released for the games under the provision that their salaries was paid for by the Brazilian Football Confederation. Despite resistance from his employer, Messi was eventually released for the games.

=== Allegation of underage gymnasts ===
In early 2008, Yang Yun, an artistic gymnast who had won two bronze medals at the 2000 Summer Olympics, was stripped of one of them, the team medal, when details of under-age teammate Dong Fangxiao were exposed, after Dong admitted on state-run television that she was 14 when she had competed. Consequently, there was frequent speculation that members of the Chinese women's gymnastics team were 14 years of age or under, violating the minimum age requirements of International Federation of Gymnastics (FIG), the governing body of the sport, that requires gymnasts to be 16, or turning 16 within the calendar year. Younger gymnasts are lighter and more supple than adult gymnasts, and have also been said to be more fearless when performing difficult manoeuvres.

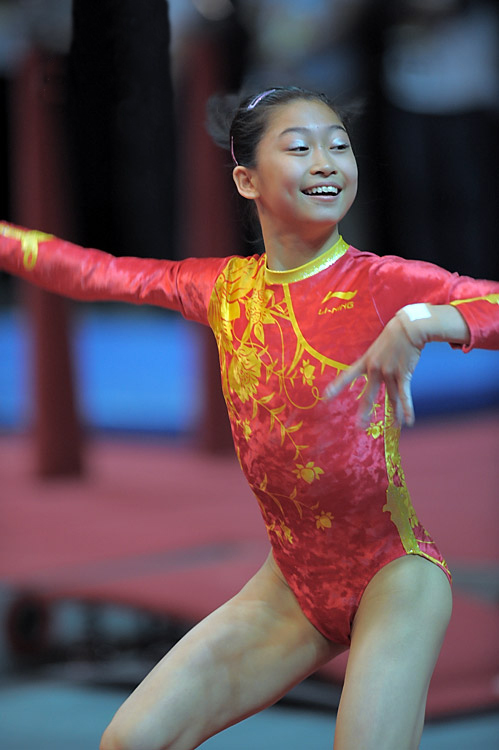
Jiang Yuyuan, one of the gymnasts investigated for, and later cleared of, age falsification

The New York Times claimed that official media and some official Web sites in China, including that of the State General Administration of Sport, listed Chinese gymnasts' details which indicated that He Kexin, Jiang Yuyuan and Yang Yilin may have been as young as 14. During the Olympics, media focused their attention on He, Yang, Jiang, and Deng. In response, Chinese officials claimed the discrepancies for He Kexin were caused by paperwork errors when the gymnast switched teams. Chinese authorities presented passport information to show that they were 16 years old as of 2008. Chinese coach Lu Shanzhen explained that Chinese competitors had for years all been small. "It is not just this time. It is a question of race. European and American athletes are all powerful, very robust. But Chinese athletes cannot be like that. They are by nature that small." Sportswriter E.M. Swift criticised the IOC for spending "millions of dollars trying to ferret out drug cheats [while ignoring] allegations of institutionalized cheating" by the Chinese government.

On 22 August 2008 the International Olympic Committee (IOC) instructed the FIG to investigate the allegations that He Kexin was under-age, and were asked to report back to the IOC later that day. The FIG accepted passport ages as valid proof and declared gymnasts eligible. On 23 August, further pressure led the FIG to request additional documentation on five of the six athletes on the Chinese team. IOC president Jacques Rogge said that FIG had demanded "birth certificates and all the documents like family books, entries in schools and things like that." While the FIG investigation was in progress, the IOC indicated reshuffling of the medals was unlikely. Having been satisfied with the proof of age received from the Chinese Gymnastics Association, the FIG ended the investigation on 1 October 2008, concluding that He and her teammates were eligible to compete.

In a related story, Yang's teammate in 2000, Dong Fangxiao, was subsequently revealed to have lied about her age. She claimed to have been 17 in 2000, but worked as a technical official at the 2008 Games, and her certification gave a birthdate of 1986—which would have made her 14 years old in 2000. In 2010, the FIG erased Dong's scores, and the IOC stripped China of its team bronze for 2000.

=== State training and expectations of Chinese athletes ===
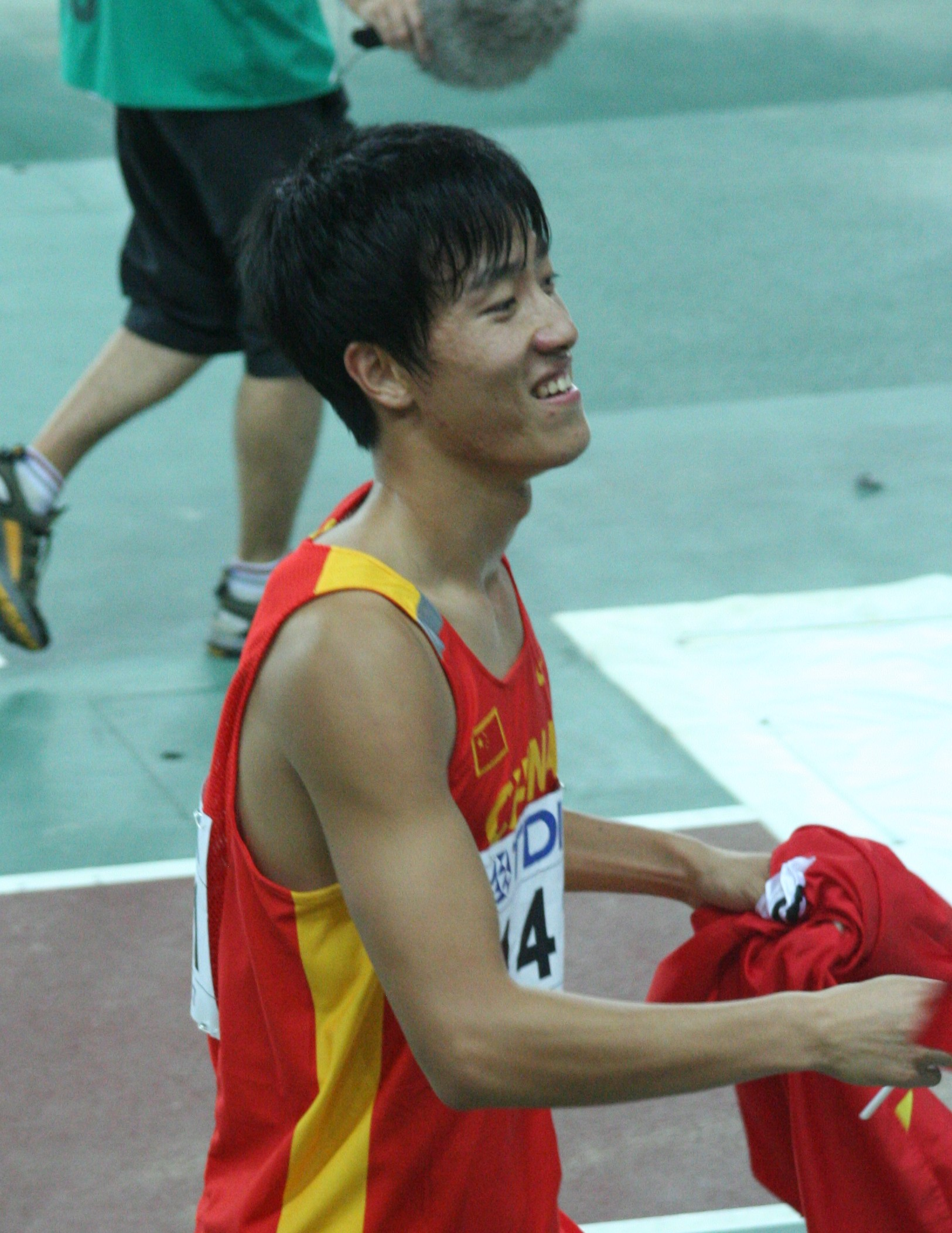
Many Chinese attributed Liu Xiang's injury and withdrawal from the 110 meter hurdles to excessive pressure he faced

As the host country, China's very high expectations put immense pressure upon athletes and coaches alike. Liu Xiang, the defending Olympic champion for the 110 meter hurdles, had pulled out of the heats with an injury. His victory in Athens four years ago was China's first gold medal in track and field, regarded by some as dispelling the widespread view that Chinese physiology was unsuitable for such a discipline. Hyped by the state and sponsors, with his fame and endorsements exceeding that of Yao Ming in China, Liu's withdrawal disappointed millions with some accusing him of being afraid to lose, while others suggested that excessive pressure may have worn him out. Liu's coach reportedly had been told by government officials that "if Liu could not win a gold medal in Beijing, all of his previous achievements would become meaningless." Josef Capousek, a former rowing coach, was fired by China's sporting federation over a contract dispute. He characterized it partly as a difference in contract translation, which he says in German means he would "aim" to get a gold medal, as opposed to saying in Chinese that he "must" win to get a gold medal. He argued that "nobody can guarantee a gold in any sport... but here, anything less than gold means nothing," overall criticizing the sustainability of such methods.

There has also been criticism of the Chinese government's training regime. Parents and children endure considerable personal sacrifices – young children often leave their families to endure long and tough training regimens in the state academies, where 250,000 children are enrolled. Critics also say that the sports schools focus on training at the expense of general education, leaving athletes unprepared to leave the sports system that has raised them. Yang Wenjun, a C-2 Canoeing champion at the Athens Olympics, told The New York Times that he was ill-equipped to go to college or start a business. He recounted officials' threats to withhold his retirement payment if he quit before the Beijing Games, adding that it was "not possible to survive without those benefits". While Yang and his family have received numerous rewards for his achievement (including white collar jobs, stipends, performance bonuses, endorsements, and an apartment), he has not seen his parents in three years.

On the opposite side, for those athletes who do win gold medals, the State offers a significant performance bonus. Cheng Fei, for example, could look forward to more than $150,000 in cash and bonuses for every Olympic Gold Medal she wins. Yang said his wins at the 2002 Asian Games netted him about [US]$28,600 in bonuses—more money than the amount his parents can earn in ten years.

=== Doping ===
Out of 4,500 samples that were collected from participating athletes at the games, six athletes with positive specimens were ousted from the competition. Although the rate of positive findings was lower than at the 2004 Summer Olympics, doping experts expressed concern due to advances in doping technology. In July 2008, a BBC investigation reported that samples positive for erythropoietin were labelled as negative by WADA-approved laboratories. The IOC stated in October 2008 that it would begin retesting samples for CERA.

== Political issues leading up to the games ==
=== Migrant workers ===
The International Labour Organization (ILO) estimated that China had 150 million migrant workers out of a total national working population of 764 million people at the end of 2006. More than 40 million of these migrant workers were employed in construction, an industry in which some 90 per cent of the workforce was composed of migrants. 2008 Summer Olympics migrant workers routinely endured dangerous work environments and lacked any safety net, including medical and accident insurance. Problems of migrant workers included unpaid wages and high legal costs.

=== Boycotts ===
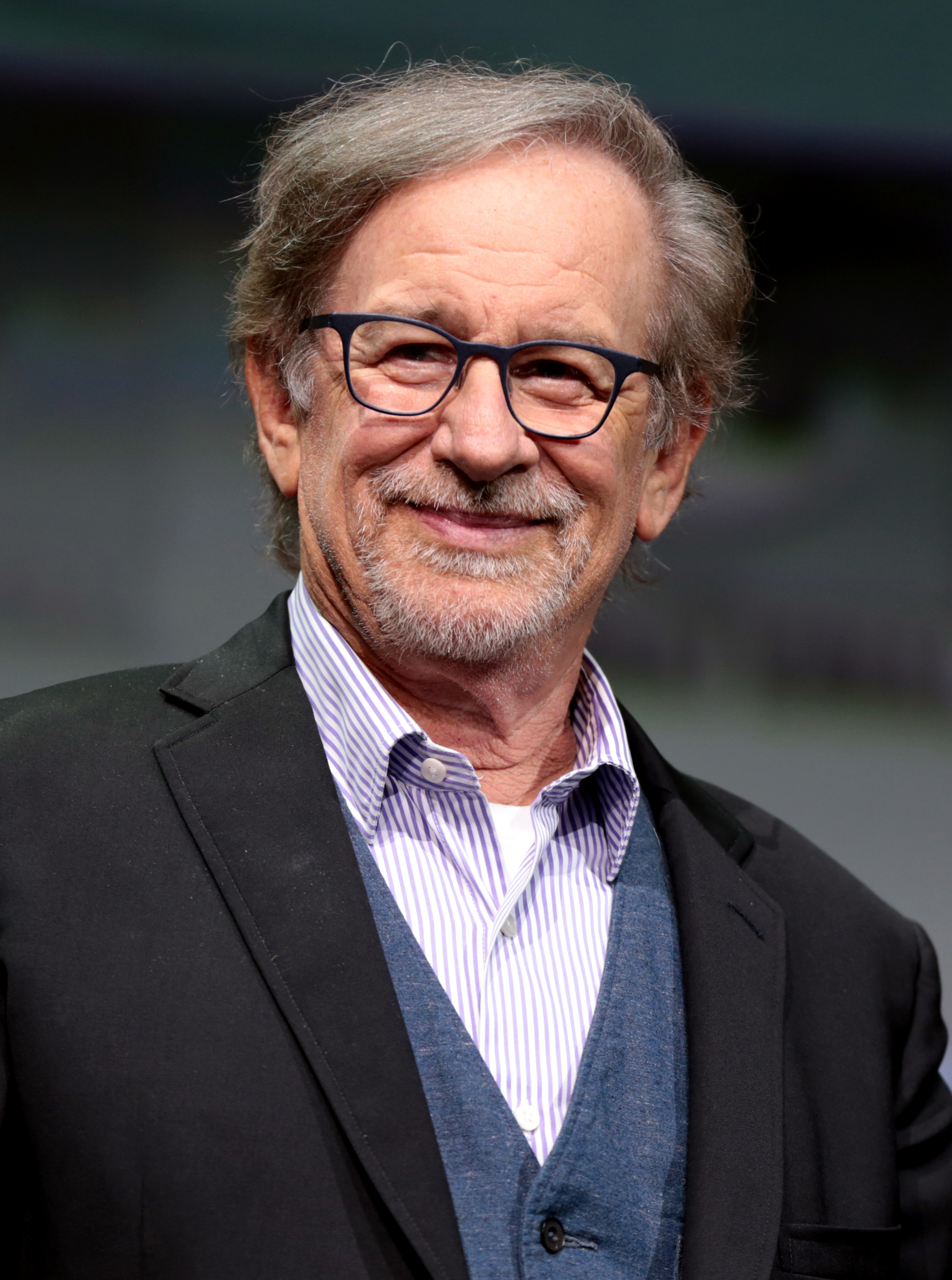
American film director Steven Spielberg's decision not to help direct the opening ceremony drew worldwide attention

Calls for sustained pressure and boycotts of the Olympics came from former French presidential candidate François Bayrou, Sudan scholar Eric Reeves and the editorial board of The Washington Post. In February 2008, American film director Steven Spielberg announced he was stepping down from his role as an artistic advisor in protest of the Chinese government's refusal to pressure Sudan to stop the "continuing human suffering" in the Darfur region, urging it to do more to stop "these crimes against humanity." European Parliament Vice-president Edward McMillan-Scott, called for a boycott of the Beijing games; and praised the Prince of Wales for not attending the Games. Additionally, 106 lawmakers in the United States circulated a letter calling for the US to boycott the Olympics because of China's support of the Sudanese regime and the forced relocation of 300,000 poor Chinese to make room for the games. US Senators John McCain and Barack Obama both claimed that they would have boycotted the ceremony if they were in the White House.

Polish prime minister Donald Tusk, became the first EU head of government to announce a boycott and was soon joined by President Václav Klaus of the Czech Republic. The German chancellor, Angela Merkel, said she will not attend opening of the Beijing Olympics. The Geneva-based group Centre on Housing Rights and Evictions claimed that 1.5 million Beijing residents would be displaced from their homes for the construction of Olympics venues. Beijing's Olympic organising committee and China's Foreign Ministry stated that 15,000 residents from 6,037 households were displaced. Some sources said that as of May 2005, 300,000 residents were evicted in preparation for the games and that police in Beijing placed many people under arrest for protesting against the evictions. Protester Ye Guozhu, who attempted to draw public attention to alleged forced evictions in Beijing due to Olympics-related construction, was sentenced in December 2004 to a four-year prison term for "picking quarrels and stirring up trouble".

The British Olympic Association (BOA) required that British participants signed an agreement before leaving for China, promising not to comment on any "politically sensitive issues." However, a BOA spokesman stated that the BOA's intention was not to censor athletes, but to reaffirm the IOC charter, which prohibits demonstration of political, religious or racial propaganda in any Olympic venues.

In general, attendance at the 2008 games was highly politicised, with as many as 80 political heads of state attending; several major political figures, however, considered boycotting the Games for political reasons. On 2 April 2008, the Japanese government announced that its royal family would not participate in the opening ceremony because of the international concern focused on the violent crackdown in Tibet. On 5 April, the newspaper Le Monde reported that French President Nicolas Sarkozy hoped that there would be an end to violence against Tibetans, the release of political prisoners, light to be shed on the events and the opening of dialogue with the Dalai Lama before the opening ceremony. The BBC wrote that while Sarkozy was opposed to a full boycott, he would "not close the door to any possibility" as far as his own attendance was concerned.

=== Terrorist incident ===
On 10 April 2008, China announced that it had foiled a plot against the games by Uyghur separatists in Xinjiang. According to the Chinese security ministry, separatists planned suicide bomb attacks on Chinese cities and kidnappings in Beijing to disrupt the Olympic Games. Uyghur activists claim that the Chinese fabricated these terror plots to prevent people in the region from voicing their grievances with the Han Chinese. On 25 April 2008, Interpol issued a warning that there was a real possibility that the Beijing Olympics would be targeted by terrorist groups.

China reported 35 arrests as part of a ten-day raid. On 4 August 2008, two attackers detonated hand grenades at a police post near Kashgar, killing 16 policemen.

=== Tibetan independence groups ===
==== Boycott calls ====
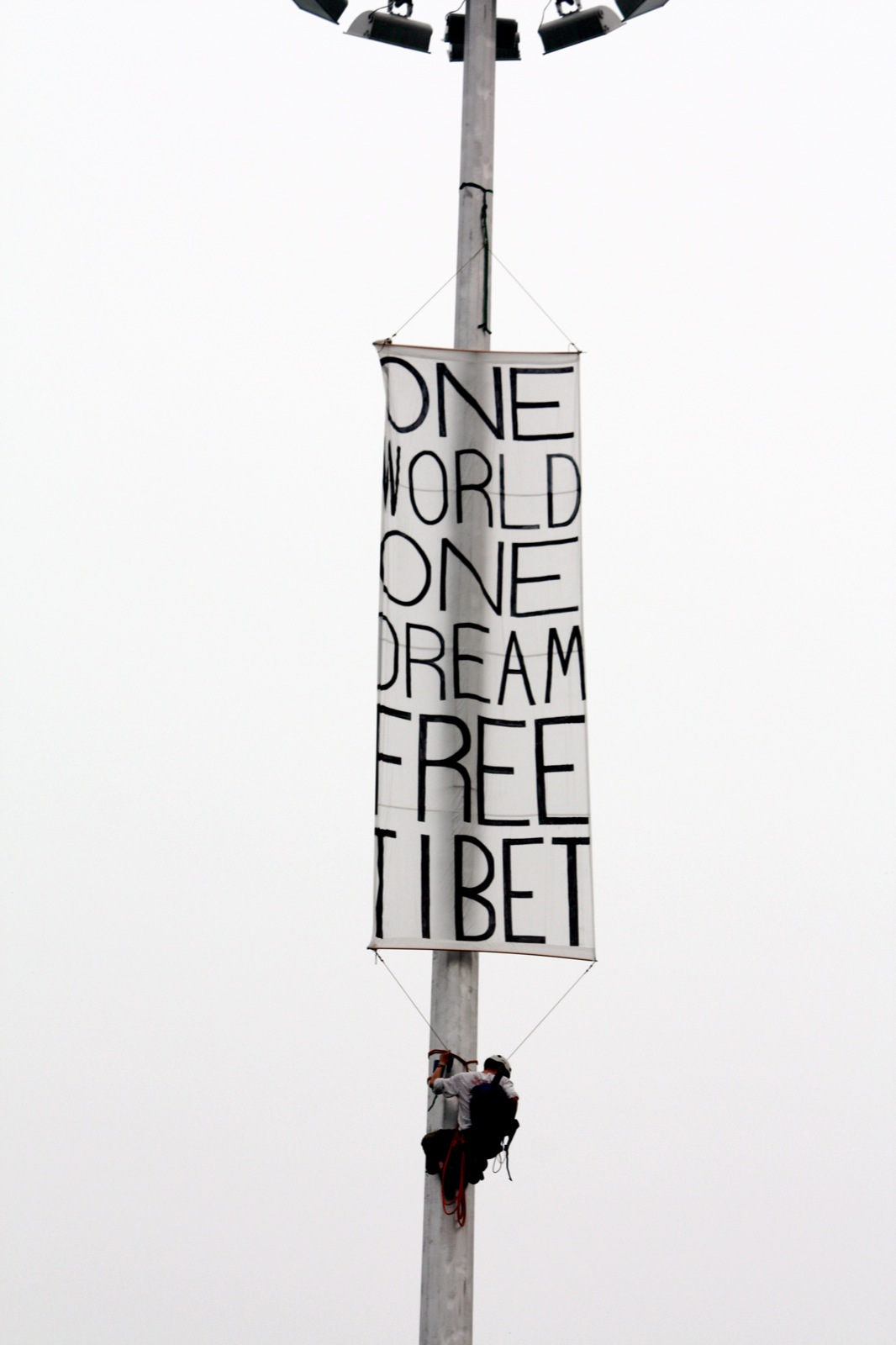
The 140 sq ft (13 m^{2}) banner which read "ONE WORLD ONE DREAM FREE TIBET"

Some pro-Tibetan independence groups, such as Students for a Free Tibet, initiated a campaign against the Beijing 2008 Summer Olympics to protest for Tibetan independence, It also objected to the use of the Tibetan antelope (chiru) as the Fuwa Yingying. The Tibetan People's Movement has also demanded representation of Tibet with its own national flag. American film actor Richard Gere, chairman of the International Campaign for Tibet called for a boycott to put pressure on China to make Tibet independent. There were also plans by Tibetans in exile to hold their own version of the Olympics in May, at the headquarters of the exiled government.

The international journalist group Reporters Without Borders (RSF) advocated boycott to express concerns over violations of free speech and human rights in China. It hoped that international pressure could effect the release of prisoners of conscience and the upholding of promises made to the IOC regarding improvements in human rights.

In March 2008, Taiwan's president-elect Ma Ying-jeou threatened a Chinese Taipei Olympic Committee boycott "if the situation in Tibet continues to worsen". Masahisa Tsujitani, a Japanese craftsman who makes shots used by many Olympic athletes, announced 14 April he refuses to allow his wares to be used at the games to protest China's treatment of protesters in Tibet.

==== Disruption of torch relay ====
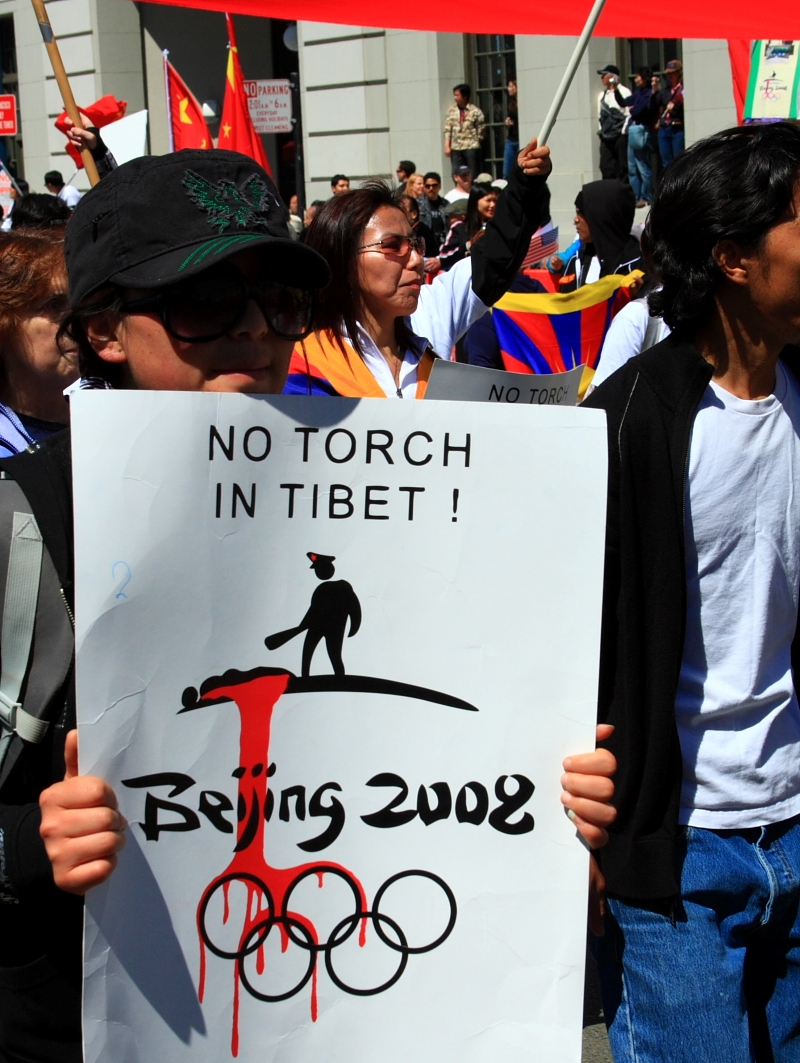
Pro-Tibetan independence protests during the Olympic Torch Relay.

During the Olympic torch lighting ceremony in Greece on 24 March 2008, three Reporters Without Borders journalists breached a cordon of 1,000 police at the ancient Olympia stadium and interrupted the speech of Liu Qi, head of the Beijing Games committee. One protester tried to snatch the microphone as another unrolled a black flag showing the Olympic rings as handcuffs.

Nearly 50 Tibetan exiles in India began a global torch relay 25 March 2008 with a symbolic "Olympic" flame that ended in Tibet on 8 August 2008, the day of the Summer Games' opening ceremonies in Beijing. Although the torch was heavily guarded by local police and Chinese security agents wearing blue track suits, protesters attempting to stop the relay or take the torch were a significant problem along the route.

Disruption of the torch relay and foreign condemnation of China resulted in a backlash of nationalism and anti-foreigner sentiment in China. French goods and businesses were threatened with a reprisals for the assault on torch-bearers through Paris, France. French retailer Carrefour was boycotted, and there were flag burning protests outside some stores. Foreign media, particularly CNN, was severely criticised for its reporting of the Tibetan riots. The media reported that the attitudes of Han Chinese citizens towards non-Chinese and Chinese minorities in China noticeably worsened. In late April, Chinese Internet censors, who had previously permitted posts critical of non-Chinese, began blocking words such as "Carrefour", in what was seen as an attempt to calm tensions before the games.

== Human rights and censorship ==
=== Protest permits and zones ===
Liu Shaowu announced on 23 July that the Public Security Bureau would issue permits for protesting in protest zones during the Olympics. The three designated locations were Purple Bamboo Park, Temple of the Sun, and Beijing World Park. On 18 August it was reported that of 77 applications, 74 were withdrawn, two suspended and one vetoed.

A number of protest applicants claim that they were wrongfully discouraged, rejected, or denied permits altogether. Some who applied for permits went missing or were detained. Others say they have decided against applying because they feared that the process was a means to collect information about dissenters.

- A Beijing woman was denied a permit to protest the razing of her home for Olympic-related development, she and 20 supporters protested one day before the Olympics. Her son claims that she was then jailed for "disturbing social order".
- A representative of 140 property owners in Suzhou Industrial Park, who sought to protest unjust behaviour by Suzhou officials in a land dispute, was interviewed by a PSB official, and then sent her back to Suzhou by four Suzhou officials who placed her under house arrest.
- Two elderly women from Beijing, aged 77 and 79, who applied five times to protest during the Olympics against what they believed was inadequate compensation for the demolition of their homes in Beijing in 2001, received a suspended one-year non-judicial sentence of re-education through labour for "disturbing the public order".
- An entrepreneur from Hunan province disappeared after trying to file for a permit to demand greater participation of citizens in political processes, and denounce rampant official corruption and abuses of power. His friend, a legal advocate from Fujian, stepped in to apply for protest permits and was reportedly escorted from the building and put into an unmarked Buick by several men, and also disappeared.
- According to The New York Times, a farmer from Heilongjiang mailed an application to protest in early August. When he went to Beijing to follow up a week later, he was promptly escorted back to Heilongjiang by authorities, and was being held by police near Xingyi.

=== Web and media censorship ===
China pledged in its Olympic bid that it would allow open media access during the games, but Human Rights Watch alleges that it had failed to do so. While some estimated 20,000 journalists had been assured unfettered Internet access by the IOC's Jacques Rogge, Sun Weide (孙伟德) of the Beijing Organizing Committee announced in late July that China would allow only "convenient" access – still blocking sites which reference controversial content. The IOC and broadcasters were uncertain as to whether the Beijing authorities would allow them to broadcast live from locations such as Tiananmen Square, fearing protests. In 2001, Beijing announced there would be complete freedom for the media to report in China. After lengthy discussions, broadcasters were permitted to broadcast between the hours of 6–10 am and 9–11 pm with prior permission; however, live interviews were banned at all times. Many broadcasters were unhappy with this decision as it would "set a bad precedent in regards to press freedom", and were pushing the authorities further on the issue.

In late July, US senator Sam Brownback alleged that foreign-owned hotels in China were ordered by the government to install equipment to monitor internet use by guests. Foreign Ministry spokesman Qin Gang said that the security arrangements did not exceed "what is normal internationally".

The IOC also investigated complaints from the international media that the Internet at the Main Press Centre was slow and some websites remain blocked, which may disrupt reporting. This was seen when Amnesty International criticised the Chinese government for not delivering on its Olympic promises of human rights; however journalists could not access the website. Additionally, websites critical of the government, or relating to Tibet and Falun Gong remain blocked at the centre. Kevan Gosper from the IOC clarified that the 'open Internet' only refers to reporting directly on the games, and not other issues relating to China. Due to international pressure, a number of websites, notably BBC, Amnesty International, Reporters Without Borders, and Apple Daily were unblocked.

When queueing for Olympic tickets descended into chaos, fighting erupted between police and ticket-buyers, including journalists from Hong Kong such as Cable TV Hong Kong, Hong Kong Oriental News, and the SCMP. Two Japanese journalists covering bomb attacks in Xinjiang and a British journalist covering a Tibetan independence protest in Beijing were 'roughed up' and detained, and the British journalist claimed that his equipment was damaged. Chinese authorities apologised for the incident involving the Japanese journalists, and registered concern from the British embassy and the IOC with the latter incident.

On 14 August, the IOC urged China to allow foreign reporters to report freely at the games. After the games had closed, the Foreign Correspondents Club of China (FCCC) issued a statement noting that there was "welcome progress in terms of accessibility and the number of press conferences within the Olympic facilities". However, the FCCC was "alarmed at the use of violence, intimidation and harassment outside". The club confirmed more than 30 cases of reporting interference since 25 July, and said it was checking "at least 20 other reported incidents".

In 2012, Dutch media reported that 7 sports journalists had accepted payment from intelligence agency AIVD in exchange for gathering intelligence for the agency during the Games. The AIVD refused to comment on the matter.

=== Arrests of political activists ===
According to Business Week, at least 50 Beijing human-rights activists were either arrested, put under house arrest, or banished from the capital during the Games. In January 2008, AIDS and human rights activist Hu Jia, who was already under house arrest, was taken into custody on 27 December 2007 for "inciting subversion". Hu had criticised China's hosting of the Olympics by comparing it to Nazi Germany hosting the Berlin Olympics. Ye Guozhu was serving a four-year sentence and was scheduled for release in 2008. On 26 July, his supposed release day, his family was sent an official police notice prolonging his detention. Amnesty International cited the police saying Ye "would be kept in detention to keep him and his family out of trouble until the Olympics and Paralympics were over." The U.S. Embassy in Beijing expressed concern over human rights groups' reports that Zeng Jinyan, blogger-wife of Hu Jia, was taken from her home on 7 August; three days later, Hua Huiqi, a leader in Beijing's underground church, was taken by security agents while on his way to church.

=== Suppression of negative news stories ===
In the lead-up to the Olympics, the government issued guidelines to the local media for their reporting during the Games: political issues not directly related to the games such as Tibetan independence and social unrest in Xinjiang were not to be reported on, as were food safety issues such as "cancer-causing mineral water." As the scandal involving melamine contamination of milk broke in September 2008, some western media evoked suspicions that China's desire for a perfect games may have been a factor contributing towards the delayed recall of contaminated infant formula, which has affected 94,000 babies with kidney stones and killed at least 4 infants, although the Central government denied issuing this guidance. Hebei provincial vice-governor said his administration was only notified by Shijiazhuang on 8 September. The World Health Organization asked Beijing why it took so many months for the scandal to become public, and to establish whether failure was deliberate or due to ignorance.

Local officials were told to stop dissatisfied citizens to come to Beijing in order not to "disrupt the harmonious atmosphere", instead grievances were to be solved at a local level. However, in some incidents, citizens felt the local government ignored their anger, leading the Weng'an riots for example.

== Environmental and health issues ==
=== Steroids and Chinese meat ===
The United States Olympic Committee imported food for American athletes, citing concerns regarding the safety of food products produced in China. In particular, athletes were concerned that eating meat that was raised in China could contain enough steroids to cause the athletes to test positive for steroid use. Several Canadian athletes received permission to do the same. The United States Olympic Committee's plan to bring its own food to China disappointed the leader of food services for the Beijing Olympics.

=== Air pollution ===
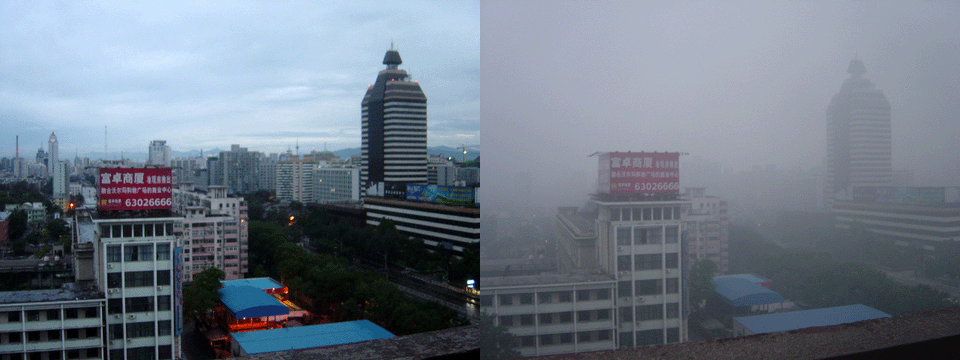
Photo taken in 2005 of Beijing's air quality on a day after rain (left) and a sunny, smoggy day (right): Severe air pollution in Beijing was considered a major risk for athletes' health and a potential setback to their performance.

Concern was raised over the air quality, and its potential effect on the athletes. (Note: Poor-quality air in China contributes to the death of about 400,000 Chinese annually. Ozone and fine particulate matter—bits of carbon, sulfates, and industrial by-products— were the two biggest pollution threats to the athletes in 2008. When high ozone levels are present, lungs are not able to absorb as much oxygen, causing coughing, wheezing, or headaches.) Although the Beijing Municipal Government, in its bid file in 2001, committed to lowering air pollution, increasing environmental protection, and introducing environmental technology, research data show that even if the city were to dramatically cut down its emissions, pollution would still drift over from neighbouring provinces, upstream from which 50 per cent of Beijing's air was believed to flow. Air pollution was at least two to three times higher than levels deemed safe by the World Health Organization. Marco Cardinale of the British Olympic Association has stated that air pollution coupled with heat and humidity makes it "very unlikely we'll see outstanding performances in endurance sports." Despite this, Beijing committed to remove 60,000 taxis and buses from the roads by the end of 2007 and relocate 200 local factories, including a prominent steel factory, before the games began. The Chinese government provided assurances that "blue skies are a requirement not only for Beijing, but also for the places around it." The United States Olympic Committee was confident that the air quality of Beijing would not be a concern for the US delegation to the games. Nevertheless, the IOC's medical commission analysed air-quality data recorded by the Beijing Environment Protection Bureau in August, when test athletic events were held in the Chinese capital. The commission found that outdoor endurance events—defined as those that include at least an hour of continuous, high-intensity physical effort—may pose some risk.

In spite of such efforts, several countries indicated that their athletes would arrive at the games as late as possible to limit exposure to pollution. Many teams set up offshore training camps in neighbouring countries to avoid the pollution. The pollution prompted several athletes to change events or opt out: for example, Ethiopian long-distance runner Haile Gebrselassie withdrew from the marathon and ran the 10,000 meters instead, to reduce the risk of harm to himself because of his asthma, and Belgian tennis player Justine Henin announced nearly a year before the games that she would not compete for the same reasons.

In July 2008, stricter emergency pollution controls were introduced, including suspending production at more factories and coal-fired power plants, lowering the number of cars on the road and expanding driving restrictions to nearby Tianjin. In early July, Beijing ordered 40 factories in Tianjin and 300 factories in Tangshan to begin suspending operations in an effort to reduce air pollution. On 20 July, a major temporary air pollution control plan began: additional factories were shut down; there were license plate restrictions which allowed Beijing motorists to drive on alternate days only, depending on whether the last number on their license plate was odd or even, to reduce daily traffic by two million vehicles. (Note: A similar approach was used for other events such as the 2015 China Victory Day Parade and the 2016 G20 Hangzhou summit.) Despite the program, by 28 July the China Daily reported that Beijing's skies remained alarmingly polluted and that authorities were considering emergency measures during the Games.

Air quality before and during the 2008 Summer Olympics
	July												August																							
	20^{†}	21	22	23	24	25	26	27	28	29	30	31	1	2	3	4	5	6	7	8	9	10	11	12	13	14	15	16	17	18	19	20	21	22	23	24
BBC PM_{10} (μg/m^{3}) early afternoon value	32	69	107	143	254	261	165	269	134	8	78	56	19	15	79	292	104	186	191	156	110	278	54	41	128	46	12	7	54	18	39	87	56	21	12	99
AP PM_{10} (μg/m^{3}) mid-afternoon average			64	162	554	584	212	384	316	39	181	157	19	35	109	432	29	251	349	345	163	604	157	162	409	97	42	30	69	20	40	144	176	55	40	75
SEPA AQI	55	64	66	89	113	109	118	113	96	90	43	69	27	34	35	83	88	85	95	94	78	82	37	32	60	61	17	23	42	25	42	53	60	36	41	45
During the 2008 Summer Olympics; PM_{10} levels higher than 50 μg/m^{3} (WHO Air Quality Guideline for 24-hour mean); PM_{10} levels higher than 150 μg/m^{3} (WHO Interim Target 1 for 24-hour mean); Air Pollution Index level higher than IOC and Chinese target of 100; † Emergency pollution control measures were implemented on July 1, 2008. Stricter measures were imposed on July 20, 2008.

As the Games began, air quality in Beijing improved significantly against prior expectations. Air quality throughout the Games recorded Air Pollution Index scores under 100, the official target. Of the 16 days of the Games, ten days recorded 'Grade I' and six days recorded 'Grade II' air quality in Chinese standards. Media concerns of air quality has also subsided as the Games progressed. However, a 28 July 2008 Greenpeace report stated that average concentration of atmospheric particulate matter in Beijing was still twice the levels the World Health Organization considers safe. Although observers doubted the performance in endurance events due to air quality, humidity and temperature, the men's 10 km and marathon events did set new Olympic records. The Chinese authority pledged to continue their environmental efforts after the Games and pointed to their ¥140 billion investment in the past ten years as evidence of their determination. After witnessing the success of their efforts, some of the temporary measures during the Games are being considered for permanent enforcement.

=== Pollution threats to sailing events ===
At the end of May 2008, two months before the start of the Olympics, a "red tide" (a type of algal bloom) was found to be developing. It began choking large stretches of the Qingdao near to the venue for the sailing events. While algae blooms are known to develop in nutrient-rich water, often as a result of chemical pollution, run-off from heavy fertiliser use or untreated sewerage; Qingdao's Ocean and Fishing Bureau said the particular temperature and salinity of sea water had been responsible in this case.

Officials in Qingdao achieved their own target of 15 July to clear the algae in the vicinity of the venue. The task force that cleaned-up more than a million tonnes of algae were said to number 1,200 boats and many thousands of troops and volunteers.

A 2-square-kilometre (0.77 sq mi) oil slick was discovered off the coast of Qingdao on 11 August. Officials said that the oil would not affect Olympic sailing, and all the sailing events proceeded as scheduled.

=== Water diversion ===
Water was diverted from Hebei and Shanxi provinces, areas already beset by drought and dramatic water shortages, to Beijing. In July 2008, the head of the Beijing Water Authority Bi Xiaogang denied that the Olympics would increase water consumption by a large amount. However, previously he and other local officials said that Beijing would divert up to 400 million cubic meters of water from Hebei for the Games with water-diversion facilities and pipes being built to pump water from four reservoirs in Hebei. Around Baoding city alone, a mostly rural area, 31,000 residents lost land and their homes due to a water transfer project; many more have been displaced throughout Hebei. According to an August 24, 2008 report by the UK's Times, much of the infrastructure intended for the water diversion scheme was left half-constructed or unused when Beijing officials realized that water demand estimates had been far too high. The number of tourists attending the Beijing games was lower than expected, and many migrant workers, ethnic minorities, and political dissidents had left the city as a result of intimidation or official requests. Nevertheless, the Hebei area had already been sucked dry to fill a number of large reservoirs, leading to drought and agricultural losses.

== Tourism ==
Prior to the Games, officials anticipated two million tourists, of which one-third would be from overseas. However, actual volume of visitors fell 9.2% year-on-year. Chinese officials cited the Sichuan earthquake, riots in Tibet, torch relay protests and the subprime mortgage crisis as factors. Locally, many people anticipated that Beijing would be too crowded during the Games. Businesses avoided scheduling meetings during these two weeks, and potential Chinese visitors decided to stay at home and watch the events on TV.

Initially, many hotel owners invested heavily for the Olympics. Many anticipated bookings in the 70% to 80% level, and room prices jumped as much as ten times the regular level. Occupancy of 77% was reported for luxury hotels in early August. For 4-star hotels and lower, occupancy of 40% led to price reductions, although still at three times the regular price. In July, Air China, the nation's flagship carrier, also saw its international passenger traffic fall by 19% from a year earlier.

Hoteliers blamed the lack of visitors on increased security measures and the tightening of visa rules and for driving out thousands of itinerant foreigners and overseas students living in Beijing. Visa requirements introduced in April required foreign visitors to have proof of their accommodation and return flight when applying to enter China. One foreign Olympics consultant was quoted as saying "they made it hard to get tickets and hard to get visas. The impression they gave was that they didn't want foreigners to come".

According to the Beijing Olympic Organising Committee (BOCOG), the 6.8 million tickets to the Games were sold out. The prevalence of empty seats at many events caused journalists and visitors to be suspicious about these claims. Beijing Olympic organisers were said to have given some 2.7 million tickets to officials and corporate sponsors, many of whom did not attend the events. A mainland journal suggested that the day-tickets without right of re-entry was also part of the problem. In one instance, people in the audience left the stadium after the Chinese women's volleyball match, but they were not allowed back when they found out there was another game. A senior BOCOG official expressed concern about the empty seats, saying that the hot, humid weather could have caused the poor turnout. Officials admitted to bussing in locals or "cheerleaders" to fill seats. The empty seats angered athletes of countries outside China, who had been told that 80 per cent of tickets had been reserved for the Chinese.

Despite early warnings published by The Guardian and efforts by official ticketing coordinators, more than $6 million in fraudulent tickets were sold by an illegitimate online ticket broker.

== Responses ==
In spite of the various controversies, International Olympic Committee president Jacques Rogge said at the closing ceremony that they were "truly exceptional Games".

Summarizing the domestic reaction to Western protests and critical media coverage, academic Xu Guoqi writes, "Critical media coverage and protests regarding the torch relay in major Western cities were taken by the Chinese as a reminder that the West did not deem them equal or good enough."

== See also ==
- Concerns and controversies over the 2010 Winter Olympics
- Concerns and controversies over the 2010 Commonwealth Games
- Controversies at the 2012 Summer Olympics
- Concerns and controversies at the 2022 Winter Olympics
- Sportswashing
- Mallon, Bill (18 January 2019). "All Olympic Doping Positives – The Count by Games". OlympStats.
