= Concerns and controversies at the 2010 Winter Olympics =

A number of concerns and controversies at the 2010 Winter Olympics in Vancouver, British Columbia, Canada, surfaced before and during the Games, and which received media coverage.

== Safety ==
=== Death of Georgian athlete Nodar Kumaritashvili ===
Hours before the opening ceremony, Nodar Kumaritashvili of Georgia was killed during a training run for the luge after he was thrown from his sled and struck a steel pillar at high speed, near the end of the course. The International Luge Federation called an emergency meeting after the accident, and all other training runs were cancelled for the day.

Vancouver Olympics Organizing Committee (VANOC) was criticized after members of the media assumed that VANOC was the governing body that conducted a prompt 12-hour investigation into the luger's death, which put the blame on the luger. In fact, it was the International Luge Federation (ILF) which conducted the investigation. The ILF had stated that it would investigate the crash and issue a report around the end of March 2010.

Furthermore, the Whistler Sliding Centre, which had recorded some of the fastest speeds in luge history, was the site of several non-fatal accidents during training runs leading up to the start of the games. For more than a year prior to the Olympics, luge competitors had complained that the track was too fast and the turns were too dangerous. Athletes had nicknamed turn 13 the "50-50" turn for their chances of getting through it without crashing. Kumaritashvili was killed on turn 16, the last turn of the course.

As a result, the height of the wall Kumaritashvili surmounted was increased, with added wooden panels and padding. Officials also ordered changes to the layout of the final turn of the Whistler luge track, making it slower and safer, and moved the men's and women's luge starts down the track.

Kumaritashvili's teammate, Levan Gureshidze, did not race. He was on the official start list for the first run but withdrew, telling other racers he could not go on. He instead flew back to Georgia to mourn the loss of his teammate.

After the starting gates were changed, competitors complained that the junior starting position enters the main track with a turn that is too tight, causing sledders problems at the beginning of their runs. Some have also complained that slowing the course has decreased the challenge and forced them to adjust their strategy.

Eleven months before the death of Kumaritashvili, VANOC chief executive officer John Furlong started to be concerned that an athlete could get "badly injured or even worse" on the luge track. Josef Fendt, who was the President of the International Luge Federation, stated in a letter to the designer of the luge track that luge track was recording "historic sled speeds" that the speeds were nearly 20 kilometres an hour faster than the track designer had anticipated. John Furlong received a copy of the letter and asked for the situation to be looked at by the "legal guys". Svein Romstad, general secretary of the International Luge Federation, stated that the International Luge Federation "would have sought major changes to the Whistler track if it had known ahead of time that speeds would be so much higher than calculated." A memo dated January 30, 2006, stated that, in March 2005, the International Luge Federation wanted major changes to six curves on the luge track including curves 15 and 16, where Kumaritashvili's problem began. Kumaritashvili's father became angry after reports showed that VANOC didn't act on their own concerns about the luge track's safety. The family of Kumaritashvili received an insurance payout worth $150,000 from the VANOC.

VANOC broke some rules in regards to the luging and bobsleigh track. International Luge Federation states that "the length for a luge track must not exceed 1,350 metres (4,430 ft)." G-force was critical in the accident that killed Kumaritashvili. The rules of the International Bobsleigh and Tobogganing Federation states that a g-force of 5 is the limit for the track. A g-force of 5.02 is possible for male lugers on the track in Whistler. The rules of the International Bobsleigh and Tobogganing Federation also state that "to prevent the deterioration of the ice during warm, sunny periods, the finish straight should be shaded or covered." Part of what was to be considered in the shading of the finish straight was the safety of the athlete. The final straight was where the accident took place. Since the investigation and currently, sliders no longer start at the upper start area, they start 190 metres (620 ft) downhill at the lower start: C1.

The President of Georgia, Mikheil Saakashvili, thanked the hosts for the way that they handled Kumaritashvili's death, which included a moment of silence and a tribute at the opening ceremony.

=== Other safety concerns ===
Given Kumaritshvili's death on the 12th, other safety issues on speed for other events were raised at these games, most notably at the Sliding Centre. Another noted injury took place in the women's downhill. The course was labelled as extremely difficult for skiers and most training runs were cancelled due to weather conditions. This resulted in several accidents during the competition event where Sweden's Anja Pärson was badly bruised following a jump prior to the finish line of the event on February 17.

In cross-country skiing, Slovenian skier Petra Majdič was severely injured after a fall during a practice run on the sprint track. The fall led to Majdič sliding off the course and falling down a rocky slope. Despite having broken ribs and a collapsed lung, Majdič completed the women's sprint event and took the bronze medal. Slovenia filed a protest with the IOC about the safety of the course, but it was dismissed.

=== Safety at LiveCity Vancouver ===
Dozens were injured and sent to hospital when a barricade erected at LiveCity Yaletown collapsed. Canadian rock band Alexisonfire played a free concert at LiveCity Yaletown on Tuesday, February 16. Ten seconds into the band's first song, the crowd of hundreds surged forward, which caused a section of the barricade to collapse, sending dozens to the ground. The band stopped playing immediately, and asked the crowd to step back. While Vancouver Police and an on-site medical team controlled the situation, the crowd was informed that the show was cancelled, and they dispersed quickly and co-operatively.

Reports indicate at least 20 people were injured with 10 being taken to hospital. On February 17 the band issued the following statement: "We are sincerely sorry that people were injured. We want to thank the security team, paramedics and police for their quick reaction. We especially want to thank our fans for cooperating and not making a bad situation worse." A representative for LiveCity Vancouver added, "When the incident occurred, everyone acted quickly, professionally, and took appropriate action. The security and on-site emergency medical response teams provided immediate assistance and care, the band kept people calm, and the crowd dispersed safely."

== Bilingualism ==
The program of opening ceremony was criticized for a perceived lack of appropriate representation of French-speaking Canadians, in spite of Canada's status as a bilingual country. The Secretary General of La Francophonie, Abdou Diouf raised objections about the lack of bilingualism during the event, as French is alongside English as an International Olympic Committee official language. Quebec Premier Jean Charest said the ceremony failed to respect and reflect the francophone community in Canada. In an interview with CBC, the Minister of Canadian Heritage, James Moore, was "disappointed" by the low representation of French Canada during the ceremony. Canadian Member of Parliament Richard Nadeau of the Bloc Québécois sees rather a lack of political will to promote Canadian bilingualism. Among the 25,000 volunteers, only 15% of them spoke French. The Commissioner of the Official Languages, Graham Fraser, was very disappointed by the lack of presence of French. He also said, "I had the impression of watching a show designed and produced in English with a French song. Even l'Hymne du Nord from the poet François-Xavier Garneau has been translated into English to be read by the actor Donald Sutherland".

VANOC, however, defended the case and said that they had made "a very deliberate focus and effort to ensure a strong celebration of Quebec culture and language." They also said that there was a significant amount of French in the opening ceremony. David Atkins, the artistic director of the opening ceremonies, said that the ceremonies did celebrate francophone Canada. Some examples of French include the speeches, the Olympic Hymn, and the officials' oath. John Furlong, VANOC CEO, IOC President Jacques Rogge, and Governor General Michaëlle Jean all addressed the crowd in English and French. Measha Brueggergosman performed the English version of the Olympic Hymn, but Dave Pierce, the music director for the games, had his associate, Donovan Seidle, compose and arrange it to have some of the stanzas performed in French. Michel Verrault, a speed-skating official, took the officials' oath in French.

In his official report on the 2010 Winter Olympics opening ceremony, Graham Fraser identified two causes for the lack of French in it. The first was a lack of understanding. The commissioner said that "it was apparent that, in several areas, the official language requirements in the multi-party agreement signed by the organizing committee and Canadian Heritage were rather vague and unclear". He also stated the secrecy traditionally given to the opening ceremony prevented the commissioner from making sure that Canada's linguistic duality was well-showcased in the show. In order to prevent such mistake for future major events held in Canada, such as the 2015 Panamerican Games, "official language requirements must be specific and clear to ensure that organizing committees grasp the importance of linguistic duality, understand their official languages obligations and plan adequately." In early 2011, the Office of the Commissioner of Official Languages published guide based on the lessons learned at the Vancouver Games to help federal institutions and organizing committees of future large-scale sporting events to better understand, plan, implement, and monitor their activities toward the full respect and inclusion of English and French.

In February 2011, one year following the Vancouver games, Furlong discussed the language controversy in the Olympics in his book Patriot Hearts: Inside the Olympics that Changed a Country. Furlong said he had received praise from Fraser before the opening ceremony because of his large number of bilingual staff. He added that he had attempted to have the Quebec Anthem Mon Pays sang at the ceremony as well, but was shot down by the song's author. Furlong defended his refusal to apologise for the perceived lack of French in the opening ceremony. He alleged that, when discussing the place of French at the Olympics, "Mr. Fraser pointed fingers from a distance but rarely pitched in with ideas or support." Fraser answered these criticism, saying that his office had given him precise indications and ideas to promote linguistic duality during the games, which were implemented. He said that, overall, the services in the Games were provided in both official languages, and that the absence of French was mostly in the cultural program, and this was the only part he took issue with. Following the release of Furlong's book on the 2010 Games, La Presse editor André Pratte wrote a severe opinion piece on the lack of French in the opening ceremony, noting that "just trying is not good enough."

== H1N1 pandemic ==
There were concerns that the H1N1 virus could spread among spectators, staff and athletes during the Games. Organizers were stockpiling vaccine and placed a high priority on vaccinating all volunteers. While each country was responsible for the vaccination of its own athletic delegation, Vancouver health officials and the International Olympic Committee strongly recommended that all athletes, spectators and other visitors be vaccinated. Some Olympic Committees required their delegations to be vaccinated against the H1N1 flu. In light of concerns, local British Columbia health officials vaccinated participants and spectators free of charge for the duration of the Games.

== Women's ski jumping ==
The IOC voted in 2006 not to include women's ski jumping in the 2010 Games on the grounds that the sport was not yet developed enough and did not meet basic criteria for inclusion. The members of the Canadian Women Ski Jumping Team filed a grievance with the Canadian Human Rights Board citing gender discrimination.

According to lobby group Women's Ski Jumping USA, a group composed of "some of the top women ski jumpers" filed a Statement of Claim with the Supreme Court of British Columbia suing the Vancouver Olympic Organizing Committee for excluding women ski jumpers from the Vancouver games claiming that their rights were violated according to the Canadian Charter of Rights and Freedoms. However, on June 10, 2009, the Supreme Court ruled against the group, stating that, though the women were being discriminated against, the responsibility belonged to the IOC, who was not covered by the Charter, "In other words, VANOC is not under a duty to distribute equally what it has no power to provide," nor even did the Charter apply to VANOC itself (though it did apply to any services VANOC provided on behalf of the Canadian or B.C. governments).

== Vancouver Olympic Village ==
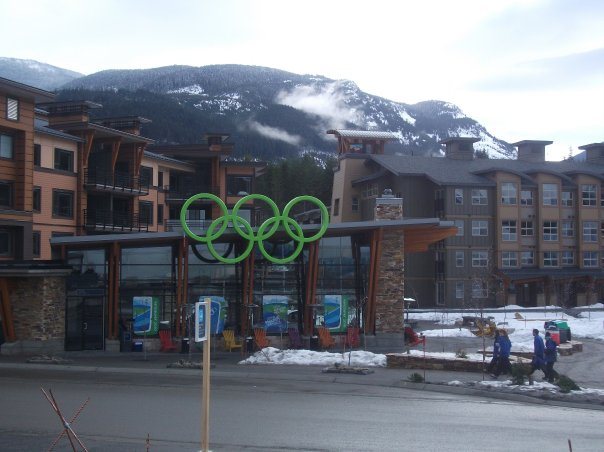
Whistler Athletes' Village (more athletes stayed there than at the village in Vancouver)

Two Olympic Villages were built: one in Vancouver and the other in Whistler, as the snow and sliding events were held at the resort. While the indoor events were held in the host city itself.

The Vancouver 2010 Olympic Village was located at Southeast False Creek and originally planned to be a model sustainable community, with state-of-the-art energy efficiency provisions, and a mix of market and social housing, at one third market, one third social housing and one third subsidized middle income housing. The city of Vancouver would break even through the sale of market housing. However, a new city council was elected in 2005 and dropped the provisions for subsidized middle income housing and then sold the lands to a private developer for C$193 million. Further controversy erupted when the private developer and its associated investment company backed out of the project, forcing the city of Vancouver to bear the liability, which resulted in the resignation of a city planner in protest and saw the city seek special legislation making changes to its charter to allow it to borrow money to finance completion of the project.

=== Australian Team Kangaroo flag ===
Leading up to the Games, the International Olympic Committee had ordered the removal of a two-story high Australian Boxing Kangaroo flag which had been draped over a balcony in the athletes' village. The IOC ordered the flag to be taken down because they believed the image to be too commercial as it is a registered trademark (albeit of the Australian Olympic Committee). The order for removal was later withdrawn after IOC president Jacques Rogge met with AOC president John Coates.

== Opening ceremonies program ==
On August 22, 2008, The Globe and Mail reported that after the budget for the ceremonies exceeded initial forecasts, the government of Prime Minister Stephen Harper mandated that the content of the opening ceremonies reflect its agenda as a condition of its contribution of C$20 million to fund the event. This was widely criticized as government interference with the arts and exercising ideological control. However, VANOC vice-president of communications Renée Smith-Valade said the government was not bringing politics into the 2010 games and did not have veto power over any part of the Olympic ceremonies.

== Security violation ==
A mentally ill man from British Columbia was able to use a homemade all-access pass at the opening ceremonies to clear several layers of security at BC Place Stadium and get close to U.S. Vice President Joe Biden, who authorities said the man had an infatuation with. Before he could reach Biden, however, he was stopped by two plainclothes Mounties, who escorted him away. The man did not face charges, but was committed to a psychiatric facility. The Royal Canadian Mounted Police (RCMP) said it did not implement any change in security at the Olympics following the breach.

== Co-optation of lines from national anthem ==
VANOC used lines from the Canadian national anthem to serve as the official slogans for the games ("with glowing hearts" in English and "des plus brilliants exploits" in French) and trademarked their use. However, VANOC stated it would only challenge usage of the lines in the case of ambush marketing, where an attempt is made to "create a specific, unauthorized commercial association with the 2010 Winter Games". The anthem itself is in the public domain.

== Trademark enforcement ==
VANOC also began protecting its brand as contractually obligated by the IOC and its marketing partners, filing lawsuits against residents attempting to register domain names related to the games, and preventing Vancouver author Kari-Lynn Winters from portraying the Olympics in a work of fiction. The VANOC also sued local businesses for using "olympic" in their names, including already-existing and long-established businesses. The House of Commons also passed laws granting protection for various terms surrounding the games.

== Civil rights and Integrated Security Unit ==
In June 2009, the Olympics Resistance Network accused the Vancouver 2010 Integrated Security Unit's (VISU) Joint Intelligence Group of "abusive and unlawful conduct" after allegedly harassing VANOC opposition activists. Concerns over policing methods have also been raised because of the head of Olympic security, RCMP Asst. Commissioner Gary Russell "Bud" Mercer, was part of the RCMP forces that blew up a truck in course of the Gustafsen Lake Standoff. Mercer was also among the RCMP who pepper-sprayed protests at the 1997 APEC conference at University of British Columbia, personally spraying a CBC cameraman and his camera, and also was part of the "War in the Woods" against tree-sit protesters in the Elaho Valley.

In October 2009, the Legislative Assembly of British Columbia through the Miscellaneous Statutes Amendment Act, 2009, gave host municipalities (Richmond, Vancouver and Whistler) the power to enter residences and other private property to seize signs that are deemed to be "anti-Olympic", between February 1 and March 31, 2010. Another amendment changed the Vancouver Charter to allow for fines of up to $10,000 and imprisonment for up to 6 months for sign and bylaw violations.

Privacy rights advocates, including Chantal Bernier, Assistant Privacy Commissioner of Canada, were concerned about the implementation of 900 security cameras placed by the RCMP Olympic Integrated Security Unit plus another 100 security cameras placed by the city of Vancouver in the Downtown area.

== Foreclosure of Whistler resort owner Intrawest ==
Creditors holding $1.4 billion in debt on Intrawest, the owners of the Whistler Blackcomb Resort, were reported on January 20, 2010, as being ready to foreclose on the resort as part of the creditor, investment bank Lehman Brothers, attempting to recover debts owed it by major creditors, including Fortress Investments, the owner of Intrawest and Whistler Blackcomb since 2006. Despite guarantees from VANOC and the Canadian government of $50 million to keep Intrawest afloat during the Games, there were doubts that the Canadian government would be forthcoming. A private source connected to Wesley Edens, owner of Fortress Investments, has said that Edens may exercise his right in that circumstance to prevent the Games from happening at the resort. VANOC sources said this is unlikely to happen since the creditors would have no reason to diminish the value of the resort that would be enhanced by hosting a prestige event, and also because of the short time-frame of the impending Games relative to the length of the legal proceedings of any auction of Fortress' assets. Fortress is also the company which backed out of the original funding arrangements for the Athletes' Village in Vancouver, and the re-financing of that project by emergency legislation and the involvement of Fortress' subsidiary, Millennium.

== Failure of ice resurfacers ==
The men's 500 metres speed skating event was delayed for over an hour at the Richmond Olympic Oval when both ice resurfacers experienced mechanical failures and a third ice machine was unable to resurface the ice properly. At least one skater withdrew from the race because of the delay and other racers stated that the delay hurt their race times.

Ice resurfacers at the games were supplied by Olympia, an official sponsor of the games. The Olympia Celletwi model is the first pollution-free, nickel-cadmium, battery-powered ice resurfacer and was selected as a part of the games "green" efforts. Following the failures, a traditional natural gas powered resurfacer built by Zamboni was brought in from Calgary. Organizers stated safety concerns for the decision.

== Ticketing ==
About 28,000 tickets for spectator places along the slopes of a number of outside events were recalled for safety reasons; ticket holders were reimbursed but had difficulty or were not able to gain access to tickets at comparable prices to these events. Visitors were also upset by a twenty dollar charge to attend ceremonies to honour medal-winning athletes. Traditionally, during the Games previous editions these ceremonies had been free of charge. Organizers also expressed concern about blocks of VIP tickets going unused leaving conspicuous empty seats at events.

In May 2010, VANOC announced that 200 people had to be reimbursed due to alleged fraudulent ticket purchases by a group of Latvians in the province who used compromised credit card information. The cost to VANOC was estimated at $2 million.

== Officiating errors ==
Observers and participants reported that several starter errors occurred during the February 16 men's biathlon pursuit. Competitors Jeremy Teela and Jean-Philippe Leguellec were started too early, before racers who were seeded higher than them. Teela stated that the early start threw off his strategy, contributing to his missing two targets in his first two shooting range stops. Teela said, "We have a couple more races this week. Hopefully the organizers figure this problem out and they make the races fair."

Starter confusion was also present during the women's pursuit earlier that day. This time both Liudmila Kalinchik and Anna Carin Olofsson-Zidek were held back and had to start several seconds too late. U.S. coach Per Nilsson stated that he had never seen an Olympic biathlon as poorly managed as the February 16 women's race.

International Biathlon Union (IBU) officials were directing the starts. The incorrect starts were attributed to a Swiss official at the women's start and a Czech official at the men's start. Norbert Baier, technical delegate for the International Biathlon Union, called it the worst day of his career and took full responsibility, stating that the mistakes were their fault. He also noted that similar incidents have previously occurred on the World Cup circuit in Europe. Notably, at the previous year's World Championships in Pyeongchang, South Korea, several competitors were sent out the wrong way on the first lap.

== Olympic Cauldron ==
The opening ceremony was stalled while organizers recovered from mechanical problems that prevented the pillars forming the cauldron for the torch lighting from completely rising out of the stadium floor as planned. However this was soon fixed as seen in the Closing Ceremony, where they made a joke out of it. An Engineer Mime climbed out of the stage as if he had just fixed it and he pretended to pull it up. Speed skater Catriona Le May Doan, who was supposed to have lit the 4th pillar, came out from the floor to finally get the chance to light it.

== Transportation ==
After problems with malfunctioning buses and lost drivers delayed spectators trying to go to or return from Olympic venues, the games organizers called in an additional 100 buses and drivers. The problematic buses and drivers were contracted from Gameday Management, an American company that had also serviced the 2002 Winter Olympics in Salt Lake City. Representatives of BC bus drivers and companies criticized VANOC for using Gameday and its American drivers instead of local operators, contending that drivers from states such as Texas were not experienced with mountain driving and winter road conditions.

== Own The Podium—2010 ==
Own the Podium—2010 / À nous le podium en 2010! was a Canadian sport technical program launched in January 2005 to prepare Canada to become the top winter sporting nation in the world by the 2010 Winter Olympics. The main aspect of the scheme that caused controversy was the priority of Canadian competitors in conducting practice runs of events, particularly at the Whistler Slide Centre, over competitors from other countries. Several of the country's former Olympians criticized the program as unsportsmanlike, while others noted that program organizers seemed oblivious to principles of good sportsmanship enshrined by the founder of the modern Olympics, Pierre de Coubertin. It had been typical in past Olympics for the host nation to allow foreign athletes to train on the courses for a certain amount of time (e.g. the U.S.A. allowed Canadian athletes to train in Salt Lake in 2002). The amount of time provided to foreign athletes for training in fact met if not exceeded the requirements of each sporting federation. An International Luge Federation official stated that more pre-Games training time had been secured than at any previous Olympic Games Canadian officials also pointed out instances at the 2002 and 2006 Olympic Games where the host Organizing Committee restricted access to its own venues; in particular among these, luge athlete Jeff Christie stated that foreign athletes were given less training time than required at the 2006 Turin Olympics.

== Canadian women hockey players seen drinking and smoking ==
Some minutes after winning their gold medal in the finals of the women's hockey tournament, a 2-0 victory over the United States on February 25, 2010, several members of the Canadian women's hockey team celebrated on the Canada Hockey Place ice while drinking beer and champagne and smoking cigars. Unbeknownst to the players, they had been photographed; their celebration was then criticized in the US media, the reason being that smoking and drinking in public was unbecoming of Olympic athletes, especially while in uniform and in their playing venue. Hockey Canada issued an apology, although other members of the Olympic community dismissed concerns over the event. The IOC considered looking into the incident. Canadian hockey captain Hayley Wickenheiser said a double standard was being applied since a male athlete would not have been judged so harshly, as was the case with skeleton gold medalist Jon Montgomery's post race beer consumption.

== Human Rights ==
Members of the Native Warriors Society pose with the stolen Winter Olympics flag, while holding a Mohawk Warriors Society flag. They stole the flag to protest the Olympics, and to honour the death of Harriet Nahanee.

The opposition to the 2010 Winter Olympic Games was expressed by various activists, politicians and communities.

=== Indigenous people ===
There was opposition to the Olympics amongst some indigenous people and their supporters. Although the Lil'wat branch of the St'at'imc Nation is a co-host of the games, a splinter group from the Seton band known as the St'at'imc of Sutikalh, who had also opposed the Cayoosh Ski Resort, feared the Olympics were bringing unwanted tourism and real estate sales to their territory. On another front, local aboriginal people as well as Canadian Inuit expressed concern over the choice of an inukshuk as the symbol of the Games, with some Inuit leaders such as former Nunavut Commissioner Peter Irniq stating that the inukshuk is a culturally important symbol to them. He said that the "Inuit never build inuksuit with head, legs and arms. I have seen inuksuit build [sic] more recently, 100 years maybe by non-Inuit in Nunavut, with head, legs and arms. These are not called inuksuit. These are called inunguat, imitation of man." Local aboriginal groups also expressed annoyance that the design did not reflect the Coast Salish and Interior Salish native culture from the region the Games were being held in, but rather that of the Inuit, who are indigenous to the Arctic far from Vancouver. One chief, Stewart Phillip, President of the Union of British Columbia Indian Chiefs, also said that the design lacked dignity, comparing it to Pac-Man. Edward John, Grand Chief of the First Nations Summit, said some native leaders were so upset about the issue they were prepared to walk out of the unveiling ceremony. The aboriginal governments of the Squamish, Musqueam, Lil'wat and Tsleil-Waututh (the "Four Host First Nations"), on whose traditional territory the games were being held, signed a protocol in 2004 in support of the games.

=== Protests ===
In 2006, environmental protests at Eagleridge Bluffs in West Vancouver over the building of a new highway resulted in the arrest of over 20 people, and jail time for two local women, Betty Krawczyk and Harriet Nahanee. Harriett Nahanee, an elderly woman, died shortly after incarceration from medical conditions thought to be exacerbated by her time in jail. According to critics, despite claims of the "greenest Olympics" ever and statements about "sustainability", the 2010 Olympics would leave behind environmental damage.

On February 13, the first day of the Games, windows of The Hudson's Bay Company, an Olympic sponsor, were smashed in downtown Vancouver by protesters. Protesters had also vandalized branches of the Royal Bank of Canada, an Olympic sponsor, in Ottawa, Vancouver and Victoria.

Reasons behind the protests were outlined in the documentary film Five Ring Circus and Helen Jefferson Lenskyj's books Olympic Industry Resistance (2007) and Inside the Olympic Industry (2000). Concerns were raised about the expense to taxpayers, estimated in 2007 to be CAN$580 million. After the stock market crash of 2008, there had been increasing concerns that Games-related projects would not meet their economic targets. The Olympic Village development, for example, was originally intended to make a profit, but at least one critic estimated it would be millions in debt. Olympic organizers did not comment on this estimate. Also protested was the displacement of low-income residents and criminalization of the poor and homeless through policies designed to make the city appear cleaner. Critics also anticipated an increase in human trafficking for the purpose of forced prostitution. The city also have hosted the Expo 86, and the event led to the displacement of hundreds of residents in the Downtown Eastside area of the city, and the Expo 2010, where 18,000 families were displaced from the Shanghai area, the 2010 Winter Olympics could have a similar effect of displacing and criminalizing poor communities, while corporate sponsors made billions of dollars of profit at the expense of peoples' lives and homes.

== See also ==
- 2010 Canada anti-prorogation protests – protests against government holiday through the Olympics
- Concerns and controversies over the 2008 Summer Olympics
- Concerns and controversies over the 2010 Commonwealth Games
