= 2012 African Boxing Olympic Qualification Tournament =

Boxing competitions

The 2012 African Boxing Olympic Qualification Tournament was held in Casablanca, Morocco from April 29 to May 5.

== Qualified athletes ==
| Weight | 1st | 2nd | 3rd | 4th | 5th | 6th |
|---|---|---|---|---|---|---|
| 49kg | Mohamed Flissi (ALG) | Abdelali Daraa (MAR) | Thomas Essomba (CMR) | Juliano Máquina (MOZ) | Sulemanu Tetteh (GHA) | Ramy Helmy (EGY) |
| 52kg | Oteng Oteng (BOT) | Benson Gicharu (KEN) | Samir Brahimi (ALG) | Duke Micah (GHA) | Hesham Yehia (EGY) | Oliver Lavigilante (MRI) |
| 56kg | Aboubakr Lbida (MAR) | Isaac Dogboe (GHA) | Romeo Lemboumba (GAB) | Ayabonga Sonjica (RSA) | Jonas Matheus (NAM) | |
| 60kg | Ahmed Mejri (TUN) | Abdelkader Chadi (ALG) | Andrique Allisop (SEY) | Abdon Mewoli (CMR) | Mohamed Ramadan (EGY) | Shafiq Chitou (BEN) |
| 64kg | Abdelhak Aatkani (MAR) | Abderrazak Houya (TUN) | Eslam El-Gendy (EGY) | Richarno Colin (MRI) | Gilbert Choombe (ZAM) | Serge Ambomo (CMR) |
| 69kg | Mehdi Khalsi (MAR) | Ilyas Abbadi (ALG) | Siphiwe Lusizi (RSA) | Seleman Kidunda (TAN) | Yannick Mitoumba (GAB) | Moustapha Hima (NIG) |
| 75kg | Badreddine Haddioui (MAR) | Mujandjae Kasuto (NAM) | Muideen Akanji (NGR) | Abdelmalek Rahou (ALG) | Mohamed Hikal (EGY) | |
| 81kg | Yahia El-Mekachari (TUN) | Ahmed Barki (MAR) | Christian Donfack (CMR) | Lukman Lawal (NGR) | | |
| 91kg | Chouaib Bouloudinats (ALG) | Maxwell Amponsah (GHA) | | | | |
| +91kg | Mohamed Arjaoui (MAR) | Blaise Yepmou (CMR) | | | | |

== Qualification summary ==
| NOC | 49 | 52 | 56 | 60 | 64 | 69 | 75 | 81 | 91 | +91 | Total |
|---|---|---|---|---|---|---|---|---|---|---|---|
| Algeria | X | X | | X | | X | X | | X | | 6 |
| Benin | | | | X | | | | | | | 1 |
| Botswana | | X | | | | | | | | | 1 |
| Cameroon | X | | | X | X | | | X | | X | 5 |
| Egypt | X | X | | X | X | | X | | | | 5 |
| Gabon | | | X | | | X | | | | | 2 |
| Ghana | X | X | X | | | | | | X | | 4 |
| Kenya | | X | | | | | | | | | 1 |
| Mauritius | | X | | | X | | | | | | 2 |
| Morocco | X | | X | | X | X | X | X | | X | 7 |
| Mozambique | X | | | | | | | | | | 1 |
| Namibia | | | X | | | | X | | | | 2 |
| Niger | | | | | | X | | | | | 1 |
| Nigeria | | | | | | | X | X | | | 2 |
| Seychelles | | | | X | | | | | | | 1 |
| South Africa | | | X | | | X | | | | | 2 |
| Tanzania | | | | | | X | | | | | 1 |
| Tunisia | | | | X | X | | | X | | | 3 |
| Zambia | | | | | X | | | | | | 1 |
| Total: 19 NOCs | 6 | 6 | 5 | 6 | 6 | 6 | 5 | 4 | 2 | 2 | 48 |

== Results ==
=== Light flyweight ===
Round of 16; April 29
Juliano Máquina (MOZ) | 24
Didier Cornet (MRI) | 14
Abdelali Daraa (MAR) | 14
Lebogang Pilane (RSA) | 11
Ramy Helmy (EGY) | KO
Japhet Uutoni (NAM)
Thomas Essomba (CMR) | 18
Bathusi Mogajane (BOT) | 9
Christopher Katanga (ZAM) | 10
Gebreselassie Addis (ETH) | 11
Mohamed Flissi (ALG)
Peter Mungai (KEN) | RET
Markus Edou (GAB) | 7
Sulemanu Tetteh (GHA) | 14

Quarterfinals; May 1
Antoine Koama (BUR)
Juliano Máquina (MOZ) | RSC
Abdelali Daraa (MAR) | 15
Ramy Helmy (EGY) | 9
Thomas Essomba (CMR) | RSC
Gebreselassie Addis (ETH)
Mohamed Flissi (ALG) | 15
Sulemanu Tetteh (GHA) | 14

Semifinals; May 4
Juliano Máquina (MOZ) | 7
Abdelali Daraa (MAR) | 10
Thomas Essomba (CMR) | 8
Mohamed Flissi (ALG) | 13

Final; May 5
Abdelali Daraa (MAR) | 7
Mohamed Flissi (ALG) | 9

=== Flyweight ===
Round of 16; April 29
Surafel Getachew (ETH) | 7
Ludumo Lamati (RSA) | 11
Johannes Simon (NAM)
Duke Micah (GHA) | WO
Obed Mutapa (ZAM) | 4
Oliver Lavigilante (MRI) | 13
Cremildo Guifutela (MOZ) | 7
Benson Gicharu (KEN) | 17
Oteng Oteng (BOT) | 16
Franck Mombey (GAB) | 6
John Fiazonli (BEN) | 10
Hesham Yehia (EGY) | 27
Abdelfattah Nafil (MAR) | 12
Samir Brahimi (ALG) | 16
Abdallah Kassim (TAN) | 7
Montassar Bouali (TUN) | 21

Quarterfinals; May 1
Ludumo Lamati (RSA) | 9
Duke Micah (GHA) | 15
Oliver Lavigilante (MRI) | 9
Benson Gicharu (KEN) | 10
Oteng Oteng (BOT) | 11
Hesham Yehia (EGY) | 4
Samir Brahimi (ALG) | 15
Montassar Bouali (TUN) | 10

Semifinals; May 4
Duke Micah (GHA) | 14
Benson Gicharu (KEN) | 17
Oteng Oteng (BOT) | WO
Samir Brahimi (ALG)

Final; May 5
Benson Gicharu (KEN) | 5
Oteng Oteng (BOT) | 16

=== Bantamweight ===
Round of 32 – April 28
| | Score | |
|---|---|---|
| Dembele N'Paly (MLI) | 6–23 | Bruno Julie (MRI) |

Round of 16; April 30
Ayabonga Sonjica (RSA) | RSC
Honore Kiala (COD)
Watch António (MOZ) | RSC
Koffi Yoboue (CIV)
Isaac Dogboe (GHA) | 15
Mohamed Bedir (EGY) | 12
Emilian Polino (TAN) | 19
Theodros Tilahun (ETH) | 8
Aboubakr Lbida (MAR) | 19
Martin Oduor (KEN) | 7
Jonas Matheus (NAM) | 14
Mumbela Mukuni (ZAM) | 5
Tefo Letshikgwane (BOT) | 6
Bilel Mhammedi (TUN) | 18
Romeo Lemboumba (GAB) | 20
Bruno Julie (MRI) | 16

Quarterfinals; May 2
Ayabonga Sonjica (RSA) | 20
Watch António (MOZ) | 10
Isaac Dogboe (GHA) | 19
Emilian Polino (TAN) | 9
Aboubakr Lbida (MAR) | 17
Jonas Matheus (NAM) | 8
Bilel Mhammedi (TUN) | 11
Romeo Lemboumba (GAB) | +11

Semifinals; May 4
Ayabonga Sonjica (RSA) | 6
Isaac Dogboe (GHA) | 8
Aboubakr Lbida (MAR) | 15
Romeo Lemboumba (GAB) | 14

Final; May 5
Isaac Dogboe (GHA) | 6
Aboubakr Lbida (MAR) | +6

=== Lightweight ===
Round of 32 – April 28
| | Score | |
|---|---|---|
| Leon Selenge (COD) | WO | Abdelkader Chadi (ALG) |
| John Colin (MRI) | 12–17 | Sinethemba Bam (RSA) |
| Benjamin Lamptey (GHA) | 14–15 | Shafiq Chitou (BEN) |

Round of 16; April 29
Mahdi Ouatine (MAR) | 9
Mohamed Ramadan (EGY) | +9
Toribio Koka (GEQ) | 6
Ahmed Mejri (TUN) | 25
Andrique Allisop (SEY) | 11
Matar Sambou (SEN) | 6
Dennis Okoth (KEN) | RSC
Bazila Ngosa (ZAM)
Abdon Mewoli (CMR) | 10
Raymond Sanon (BUR) | 6
Jeremiah Nakathila (NAM) | 16
Ali Sidibe (CIV) | 10
Mmoloki Nogeng (BOT) | 5
Abdelkader Chadi (ALG) | 21
Sinethemba Bam (RSA) | 11
Shafiq Chitou (BEN) | 14

Quarterfinals; May 1
Mohamed Ramadan (EGY) | 12
Ahmed Mejri (TUN) | 13
Andrique Allisop (SEY) | 19
Dennis Okoth (KEN) | 18
Abdon Mewoli (CMR) | 10
Jeremiah Nakathila (NAM) | 7
Abdelkader Chadi (ALG) | 11
Shafiq Chitou (BEN) | 6

Semifinals; May 4
Ahmed Mejri (TUN) | 16
Andrique Allisop (SEY) | 8
Abdon Mewoli (CMR) | 6
Abdelkader Chadi (ALG) | 13

Final; May 5
Ahmed Mejri (TUN) | WO
Abdelkader Chadi (ALG)

=== Light welterweight ===
Round of 32 – April 28
| | Score | |
|---|---|---|
| Gilbert Choombe (ZAM) | 12–5 | Victorian Njaiti (TAN) |
| Abderrazak Houya (TUN) | 15–11 | Musah Rahman Lawson (GHA) |
| Tulani Mbenge (RSA) | 8–11 | Sid Ali Berrag (ALG) |

Round of 16; April 30
Mekbebe Kemal (ETH) | 4
Serge Ambomo (CMR) | 17
Romaric Bassole (BUR) | 13
Victor Onyango (KEN) | 10
Wilfried Mapaga (GAB) | 2
Abdelhak Aatkani (MAR) | 16
Ensa Jammeh (GAM) | 1
Richarno Colin (MRI) | 19
Olaiya Awolusi (NGR) | 12
Ibrahima Konaté (MLI) | 10
Gomotsang Gaasite (BOT) | 8
Eslam El-Gendy (EGY) | 14
Adamou Mounkaila (NIG)
Gilbert Choombe (ZAM) | KO
Abderrazak Houya (TUN) | 13
Sid Ali Berrag (ALG) | 9

Quarterfinals; May 2
Serge Ambomo (CMR) | 11
Romaric Bassole (BUR) | 12
Abdelhak Aatkani (MAR) | 11
Richarno Colin (MRI) | 8
Olaiya Awolusi (NGR) | 3
Eslam El-Gendy (EGY) | 12
Gilbert Choombe (ZAM) | 5
Abderrazak Houya (TUN) | 11

Semifinals; May 4
Romaric Bassole (BUR) | 6
Abdelhak Aatkani (MAR) | 12
Eslam El-Gendy (EGY) | 5
Abderrazak Houya (TUN) | 14

Final; May 5
Abdelhak Aatkani (MAR) | 13
Abderrazak Houya (TUN) | 6

- Romaric Bassole of Burkina Faso originally won the bronze medal, but was disqualified after he tested positive for doping.

=== Welterweight ===
Round of 32 – April 28
| | Score | |
|---|---|---|
| Mehdi Khalsi (MAR) | 12–11 | Rayton Nduku (KEN) |
| Luvumbu Júnior (ANG) | 4–13 | Kehinde Ademuyiwa (NGR) |

Round of 16; April 29
Yannick Mitoumba (GAB) | 14
Jonathan Ramchurn (MRI) | 9
Mohamed Diaby (MLI) | 16
Azumah Mohammed (GHA) | 8
Siphiwe Lusizi (RSA) | 16
Kitson Julie (SEY) | 13
Joseph Mulema (CMR) | 22
Mohamed Sillah (SLE) | 4
Muhammed Camara (GAM) | DSQ
Moustapha Hima (NIG)
Ilyas Abbadi (ALG) | 18
Aymen Mejri (TUN) | 14
Seleman Kidunda (TAN) | RSC
Kab Thiam (SEN)
Mehdi Khalsi (MAR) | 13
Kehinde Ademuyiwa (NGR) | 8

Quarterfinals; May 2
Yannick Mitoumba (GAB)
Mohamed Diaby (MLI) | RSC
Siphiwe Lusizi (RSA) | 14
Joseph Mulema (CMR) | 13
Moustapha Hima (NIG) | 7
Ilyas Abbadi (ALG) | 15
Seleman Kidunda (TAN) | 3
Mehdi Khalsi (MAR) | 15

Semifinals; May 4
Mohamed Diaby (MLI) | +15
Siphiwe Lusizi (RSA) | 15
Ilyas Abbadi (ALG) | 6
Mehdi Khalsi (MAR) | 7

Final; May 5
Mohamed Diaby (MLI) | 9
Mehdi Khalsi (MAR) | 13

- Mohamed Diaby of Mali originally won the silver medal, but was disqualified after he tested positive for doping.

=== Middleweight ===
Round of 32 – April 28
| | Score | |
|---|---|---|
| Hlahla Hobwana (RSA) | 4–12 | Lerrone Richards (GHA) |
| Konga Bola (COD) | KO | Emilio Rondo (GEQ) |

Round of 16; April 30
Badreddine Haddioui (MAR) | 16
Kennedy St. Pierre (MRI) | 6
Mohamed Hikal (EGY) | 15
John Olawale (TOG) | 1
Jovette Jean (SEY) | 6
Vidal Gaieta (ANG) | 11
Mamadou Fall (SEN) | 15
Muideen Akanji (NGR) | 23
Hassan Chagtemi (TUN) | 18
Tobias Okeyo (KEN) | 8
Chanel Tessa (GAB) | 7
Mujandjae Kasuto (NAM) | 12
Felix Manga (CMR) | 15
Abdelmalek Rahou (ALG) | 20
Lerrone Richards (GHA) | 20
Konga Bola (COD) | 9

Quarterfinals; May 2
Badreddine Haddioui (MAR) | +10
Mohamed Hikal (EGY) | 10
Vidal Gaieta (ANG) | 3
Muideen Akanji (NGR) | 14
Hassan Chagtemi (TUN) | 15
Mujandjae Kasuto (NAM) | 16
Abdelmalek Rahou (ALG) | 16
Lerrone Richards (GHA) | 9

Semifinals; May 4
Badreddine Haddioui (MAR) | +7
Muideen Akanji (NGR) | 7
Mujandjae Kasuto (NAM) | 12
Abdelmalek Rahou (ALG) | 11

Final; May 5
Badreddine Haddioui (MAR) | 10
Mujandjae Kasuto (NAM) | 2

=== Light heavyweight ===
Round of 16; April 28
Mbacké Sarr (SEN) | 7
Lukman Lawal (NGR) | 11

Quarterfinals; May 1
James Agathe (MRI) | 14
Christian Donfack (CMR) | 24
Aziz Ali (KEN) | 4
Yahia El-Mekachari (TUN) | 12
David Bawa (GHA) | 12
Ahmed Barki (MAR) | 18
El-Mohamedy Amin (EGY) | 8
Lukman Lawal (NGR) | 12

Semifinals; May 4
Christian Donfack (CMR) | 8
Yahia El-Mekachari (TUN) | 16
Ahmed Barki (MAR) | 14
Lukman Lawal (NGR) | 11

Final; May 5
Yahia El-Mekachari (TUN) | WO
Ahmed Barki (MAR)

=== Heavyweight ===
Round of 16; April 28
Assane Faye (SEN)
Chedly Jemi (TUN) | RSCH
Efetobor Apochi (NGR) | +11
Abdelouahed Bendaghour (MAR) | 11
Maxwell Amponsah (GHA) | 20
Arnold Phuzi (RSA) | 15
Tumba Silva (ANG) | 9
Daniel Shisia (KEN) | 21
Romarick Ngoula (CMR) | RSCH
Junior Bayou (CIV)

Quarterfinals; April 30
Chouaib Bouloudinats (ALG) | KO
Abdul Rashid Bangura (SLE)
Karem El-Ghanam (EGY) | DSQ
Chedly Jemi (TUN)
Efetobor Apochi (NGR) | 16
Maxwell Amponsah (GHA) | 19
Daniel Shisia (KEN) | 19
Romarick Ngoula (CMR) | 14

Semifinals; May 4
Chouaib Bouloudinats (ALG) | 17
Chedly Jemi (TUN) | 3
Maxwell Amponsah (GHA) | 11
Daniel Shisia (KEN) | 10

Final; May 5
Chouaib Bouloudinats (ALG) | WO
Maxwell Amponsah (GHA)

=== Super heavyweight ===
Round of 16; April 29
Tobias Munihango (NAM) | 15
Kamel Rahmani (ALG) | 18
Mohamed Arjaoui (MAR) | 12
Aymen Trabelsi (TUN) | 6

Quarterfinals; May 1
Madian Issa (EGY) | RSC
Ronny Legras (SEY)
Meji Mwamba (COD) | 8
Blaise Yepmou (CMR) | 26
Charles Okoth (KEN) | 20
Paul Schafer (RSA) | 12
Kamel Rahmani (ALG) | 5
Mohamed Arjaoui (MAR) | 10

Semifinals; May 4
Madian Issa (EGY)
Blaise Yepmou (CMR) | RSC
Charles Okoth (KEN) | 9
Mohamed Arjaoui (MAR) | 11

Final; May 5
Blaise Yepmou (CMR) | 12
Mohamed Arjaoui (MAR) | 13

== See also ==
- Boxing at the 2012 Summer Olympics – Qualification
