= Morocco at the 2012 Summer Olympics =

- IOC code: MAR
- NOC: Moroccan Olympic Committee
- Website: www.cnom.org.ma (in French)

in London
- Competitors: 63 in 12 sports
- Flag bearer: Wiam Dislam
- Medals Ranked 79th: Gold 0 Silver 0 Bronze 1 Total 1

Summer Olympics appearances (overview)
- 1960; 1964; 1968; 1972; 1976; 1980; 1984; 1988; 1992; 1996; 2000; 2004; 2008; 2012; 2016; 2020; 2024

Morocco competed at the 2012 Summer Olympics in London, from 27 July to 12 August 2012. It was the nation's thirteenth appearance at the Olympics, having not participated at the 1980 Summer Olympics in Moscow because of its support of the United States boycott.

Comité Olympique Marocain sent the nation's largest ever delegation to the Games. A total of 63 athletes, 46 men and 17 women, competed in 12 sports, including the nation's Olympic debut in equestrian events. Men's football was the only team event in which Morocco was represented at these Olympic games. Twelve of the athletes had competed in Beijing, including world indoor champion and middle-distance runner Abdalaati Iguider, and breaststroke swimmer Sara El Bekri. Arab Games champion and taekwondo jin Wiam Dislam was the nation's flag bearer at the opening ceremony. Among the sports played by the athletes, Morocco also marked its Olympic return in slalom canoeing and road cycling after long years of absence.

Morocco, however, failed to win a gold and a silver medal in the Olympics for the first time since 1976, after poor athletic performances at these games. Abdalaati Iguider won the nation's only medal, a bronze, in the men's 1500 metres.

== Medalists ==
Medal	Name	Sport	Event	Date
Bronze	Abdalaati Iguider	Athletics	Men's 1500 metres	7 August

== Athletics ==
Moroccan athletes have so far achieved qualifying standards in the following athletics events (up to a maximum of 3 athletes in each event at the 'A' Standard, and 1 at the 'B' Standard):

Key

- Note–Ranks given for track events are within the athlete's heat only
- Q = Qualified for the next round
- q = Qualified for the next round as a fastest loser or, in field events, by position without achieving the qualifying target
- NR = National record
- N/A = Round not applicable for the event
- Bye = Athlete not required to compete in round

Men

Athlete	Event	Heat		Semifinal		Final	
Athlete	Event	Result	Rank	Result	Rank	Result	Rank
Soufiyan Bouqantar	5000 m	13:47.63	18	—N/a		Did not advance	
Abderrahime Bouramdane	Marathon	—N/a				DNF	
Amine El Manaoui	800 m	1:48.48	6	Did not advance			
Hamid Ezzine	3000 m steeplechase	8:21.25	3 Q	—N/a		8:24.90	7
Abdalaati Iguider	1500 m	3:41.08	2 Q	3:34.00	1 Q	3:35.13	3rd place, bronze medalist(s)
Abdalaati Iguider	5000 m	13:15.49	5 Q	—N/a		13:44.19	6
Rachid Kisri	Marathon	—N/a				2:15:09	18
Amine Laâlou	1500 m	Disqualified due to doping					
Aziz Lahbabi	5000 m	13:47.57	14	—N/a		Did not advance	
Mohamed Moustaoui	1500 m	3:37.41	8 q	3:43.33	6	Did not advance	
Aziz Ouhadi	200 m	20.80	6	Did not advance			
Hicham Sigueni	3000 m steeplechase	8:35.89	10	—N/a		Did not advance	
Brahim Taleb	3000 m steeplechase	8:29.02	3 Q	—N/a		8:32.40	11

Women

Athlete	Event	Heat		Semifinal		Final	
Athlete	Event	Result	Rank	Result	Rank	Result	Rank
Malika Akkaoui	800 m	2:01.78	4 q	2:00.32	4	Did not advance	
Salima Ouali Alami	3000 m steeplechase	9:44.62	11	—N/a		Did not advance	
Kaltoum Bouaasayriya	3000 m steeplechase	9:58.77	10	—N/a		Did not advance	
Halima Hachlaf	800 m	2:00.99	3 Q	1:58.84	5	Did not advance	
Siham Hilali	1500 m	4:13.34	2 Q	4:04.79	9	Did not advance	
Soumiya Labani	Marathon	—N/a				DNF	
Btissam Lakhouad	1500 m	DNF		Did not advance			
Hayat Lambarki	400 m hurdles	55.58	4 Q	56.18	6	Did not advance	
Nadia Noujani	5000 m	DNF		—N/a		Did not advance	
Samira Raif	Marathon	—N/a				2:38:31	73

== Boxing ==
Morocco has so far qualified boxers for the following events

Men

Athlete	Event	Round of 32	Round of 16	Quarterfinals	Semifinals	Final	
Athlete	Event	Opposition Result	Opposition Result	Opposition Result	Opposition Result	Opposition Result	Rank
Abdelali Daraa	Light flyweight	Essomba (CMR); L 10–13	Did not advance				
Aboubakr Seddik Lbida	Bantamweight	Balla (AUS); L 16–16^{+}	Did not advance				
Abdelhak Aatakni	Light welterweight	Colin (MRI); L 10–16	Did not advance				
Mehdi Khalsi	Welterweight	Suzuki (JPN); L 13–14	Did not advance				
Badr-Eddine Haddioui	Middleweight	Atoev (UZB); L 9–11	Did not advance				
Ahmed Barki	Light heavyweight	Meng Fl (CHN); L 8–17	Did not advance				
Mohammed Arjaoui	Super heavyweight	—N/a	Mendouo (CMR); W 15–6	Cammarelle (ITA); L 11–12	Did not advance		

Women

Athlete	Event	Round of 16	Quarterfinals	Semifinals	Final	
Athlete	Event	Opposition Result	Opposition Result	Opposition Result	Opposition Result	Rank
Mahjoub Oubtil	Lightweight	—N/a	Araujo (BRA); L 12–16	Did not advance		

== Canoeing ==
=== Slalom ===
Morocco has qualified boats for the following events

Athlete	Event	Preliminary						Semifinal		Final	
Athlete	Event	Run 1	Rank	Run 2	Rank	Best	Rank	Time	Rank	Time	Rank
Jihane Semlal	Women's K-1	174.09	20	276.32	21	174.09	21	Did not advance – Report			

== Cycling ==
=== Road ===
Athlete	Event	Time	Rank
Soufiane Haddi	Men's road race	Did not finish	
Adil Jelloul	Men's road race	5:46:37	62
Mouhssine Lahsaini	Men's road race	Did not finish	
Mouhssine Lahsaini	Men's time trial	57:25.24	34

== Equestrian ==
=== Dressage ===
Athlete	Horse	Event	Grand Prix		Grand Prix Special		Grand Prix Freestyle		Overall	
Athlete	Horse	Event	Score	Rank	Score	Rank	Technical	Artistic	Score	Rank
Yassine Rahmouni	Floresco	Individual	64.453	49	Did not advance					

== Fencing ==
Morocco has qualified 2 fencers.

Men

Athlete	Event	Round of 64	Round of 32	Round of 16	Quarterfinal	Semifinal	Final / BM	
Athlete	Event	Opposition Score	Opposition Score	Opposition Score	Opposition Score	Opposition Score	Opposition Score	Rank
Abdelkarim El Haouari	Individual épée	Imre (HUN); L 8–15	Did not advance					
Lahoussine Ali	Individual foil	Toldo (BRA); L 6–15	Did not advance					

== Football ==
Morocco men's football team qualified for the event by reaching the final of the 2011 CAF U-23 Championship.

=== Men's tournament ===
Team roster

The following is the Morocco squad in the men's football tournament of the 2012 Summer Olympics.

Coach: (Netherlands) Pim Verbeek

No.	Pos.	Player	Date of birth (age)	Caps	Goals	2012 club
1	GK	Mohamed Amsif	7 February 1989 (aged 23)			(German Football Association) FC Augsburg
2	DF	Abdelatif Noussir	20 February 1990 (aged 22)			(Royal Moroccan Football Federation) FUS Rabat
3	DF	Mohamed Abarhoun	3 May 1989 (aged 23)			(Royal Moroccan Football Federation) MA Tétouan
4	DF	Abdelhamid El Kaoutari	17 March 1990 (aged 22)			(French Football Federation) Montpellier
5	DF	Zakarya Bergdich	7 January 1989 (aged 23)			(French Football Federation) Lens
6	MF	Imad Najah	19 February 1991 (aged 21)			(Royal Dutch Football Association) PSV
7	FW	Zakaria Labyad	9 March 1993 (aged 19)			(Portuguese Football Federation) Sporting CP
8	MF	Driss Fettouhi (c)	30 September 1989 (aged 22)			(French Football Federation) Istres
9	FW	Nordin Amrabat*	31 March 1987 (aged 25)			(Turkish Football Federation) Galatasaray
10	MF	Abdelaziz Barrada	19 June 1989 (aged 23)			(Royal Spanish Football Federation) Getafe
11	FW	Soufiane Bidaoui	20 April 1990 (aged 22)			(Royal Belgian Football Association) Lierse
12	MF	Omar El Kaddouri	21 August 1990 (aged 21)			(Italian Football Federation) Brescia
13	DF	Zouhair Feddal	1 January 1989 (aged 23)			(Royal Spanish Football Federation) Espanyol B
14	MF	Houssine Kharja*	9 November 1982 (aged 29)			(Qatar Football Association) Al-Arabi
15	MF	Rayan Frikeche	9 October 1991 (aged 20)			(French Football Federation) Angers
16	DF	Yassine Jebbour	24 August 1991 (aged 20)			(French Football Federation) Rennes
17	FW	Soufian El Hassnaoui	28 October 1989 (aged 22)			(Royal Dutch Football Association) De Graafschap
18	GK	Yassine Bounou	5 April 1991 (aged 21)			(Royal Spanish Football Federation) Atlético Madrid B

* Over-aged player.

Group play

Pos	Team	Pld	W	D	L	GF	GA	GD	Pts	Qualification
1	Japan	3	2	1	0	2	0	+2	7	Advance to knockout stage
2	Honduras	3	1	2	0	3	2	+1	5	Advance to knockout stage
3	Morocco	3	0	2	1	2	3	−1	2	
4	Spain	3	0	1	2	0	2	−2	1	

Source: FIFA
Rules for classification: Group stage tiebreakers
26 July 2012
12:00

Honduras	2–2	Morocco
Bengtson 56', 65' (pen.)	Report	Barrada 39'; Labyad 67'

Hampden Park, Glasgow
Attendance: 23,421
Referee: Pavel Královec (Czech Republic)

29 July 2012
17:00

Japan	1–0	Morocco
Nagai 84'	Report

St James' Park, Newcastle
Attendance: 24,936
Referee: Svein Oddvar Moen (Norway)

1 August 2012
17:00

Spain	0–0	Morocco
	Report

Old Trafford, Manchester
Attendance: 35,973
Referee: Ben Williams (Australia)

== Judo ==
Morocco has qualified 4 judokas.

Athlete	Event	Round of 64	Round of 32	Round of 16	Quarterfinals	Semifinals	Repechage	Final / BM	
Athlete	Event	Opposition Result	Opposition Result	Opposition Result	Opposition Result	Opposition Result	Opposition Result	Opposition Result	Rank
Yassine Moudatir	Men's −60 kg	Bye	Jokinen (FIN); L 0000–0100	Did not advance					
Safouane Attaf	Men's −81 kg	Bye	Saryee (LBR); W 1000–0000	Guilheiro (BRA); L 0001–1001	Did not advance				
El Mehdi Malki	Men's +100 kg	—N/a	Roudaki (IRI); W 0100–0000	Bor (HUN); L 0000–0100	Did not advance				
Rizlen Zouak	Women's −63 kg	—N/a	Drexler (AUT); L 0000–0011	Did not advance					

== Shooting ==
Women

Athlete	Event	Qualification		Final	
Athlete	Event	Points	Rank	Points	Rank
Yasmina Mesfioui	Trap	61	21	Did not advance	

== Swimming ==
Moroccan swimmers have so far achieved qualifying standards in the following events (up to a maximum of 2 swimmers in each event at the Olympic Qualifying Time (OQT), and potentially 1 at the Olympic Selection Time (OST)):

Women

Athlete	Event	Heat		Semifinal		Final	
Athlete	Event	Time	Rank	Time	Rank	Time	Rank
Sara El Bekri	100 m breaststroke	1:08.21	18	Did not advance			
Sara El Bekri	200 m breaststroke	2:26.05	11 Q	2:25.86	11	Did not advance	
Sara El Bekri	400 m individual medley	4:53.21	32	—N/a		Did not advance	

== Taekwondo ==
Morocco has qualified 3 athletes.

Athlete	Event	Round of 16	Quarterfinals	Semifinals	Repechage	Bronze Medal	Final	
Athlete	Event	Opposition Result	Opposition Result	Opposition Result	Opposition Result	Opposition Result	Opposition Result	Rank
Issam Chernoubi	Men's −80 kg	Bahave (AFG); L 3–4	Did not advance					
Sanaa Atabrour	Women's −49 kg	López (ARG); L 0–1	Did not advance					
Wiam Dislam	Women's +67 kg	Hernández (CUB); L 0–1 SDP	Did not advance					

== Wrestling ==
Morocco has qualified two quota places.

Key:

- VT - Victory by Fall.
- PP - Decision by Points - the loser with technical points.
- PO - Decision by Points - the loser without technical points.

Men's Greco-Roman

Athlete	Event	Qualification	Round of 16	Quarterfinal	Semifinal	Repechage 1	Repechage 2	Final / BM	
Athlete	Event	Opposition Result	Opposition Result	Opposition Result	Opposition Result	Opposition Result	Opposition Result	Opposition Result	Rank
Fouad Fajjari	−55 kg	Bye	Nyblom (DEN); L 0–3 ^{PO}	Did not advance					19
Choucri Atafi	−96 kg	Bye	Ayari (TUN); L 1–3 ^{PP}	Did not advance					15
