= Cameroon at the 2012 Summer Olympics =

- IOC code: CMR
- NOC: Cameroon Olympic and Sports Committee
- Website: www.cnosc.org (in French)

in London
- Competitors: 33 in 9 sports
- Flag bearer: Annabelle Ali
- Medals Ranked 79th: Gold 0 Silver 0 Bronze 1 Total 1

Summer Olympics appearances (overview)
- 1964; 1968; 1972; 1976; 1980; 1984; 1988; 1992; 1996; 2000; 2004; 2008; 2012; 2016; 2020; 2024

Cameroon competed at the 2012 Summer Olympics in London, United Kingdom, from 27 July to 12 August 2012. This was the nation's thirteenth appearance at the Olympics.

Comité National Olympique et Sportif du Cameroun sent a total of 33 athletes to the Games, 10 men and 23 women, to compete in 9 sports. For the first time in its Olympic history, Cameroon was represented by more female than male athletes because of its presence in women's football. Freestyle wrestler and All-African Games gold medalist Annabelle Ali was the nation's flag bearer at the opening ceremony.

Seven of its athletes "defected" while participating in the Olympics, including the reserve goalkeeper Drusille Ngako, swimmer Paul Ekane Edingue and boxers Thomas Essomba, Christian Donfack Adjoufack, Abdon Mewoli, Blaise Yepmou Mendouo and Serge Ambomo.

Cameroon won with a bronze medal due to medals reallocation after all of the original medalists stripped for doping, after winning gold medals in athletics and football for three successive games.

== Medalists ==
Medal	Name	Sport	Event	Date
Bronze	Madias Nzesso	Weightlifting	Women's 75 kg	3 August

== Athletics ==
Cameroonian athletes achieved qualifying standards in the following athletics events (up to a maximum of 3 athletes in each event at the 'A' Standard, and 1 at the 'B' Standard):

Key

- Note–Ranks given for track events are within the athlete's heat only
- Q = Qualified for the next round
- q = Qualified for the next round as a fastest loser or, in field events, by position without achieving the qualifying target
- NR = National record
- N/A = Round not applicable for the event
- Bye = Athlete not required to compete in round

Men

Athlete	Event	Heat		Quarterfinal		Semifinal		Final	
Athlete	Event	Result	Rank	Result	Rank	Result	Rank	Result	Rank
Idrissa Adam	100 m	Bye		DNF		Did not advance			

Women

Athlete	Event	Heat		Quarterfinal		Semifinal		Final	
Athlete	Event	Result	Rank	Result	Rank	Result	Rank	Result	Rank
Delphine Atangana	100 m	11.71	1 Q	11.82	7	Did not advance			

== Boxing ==
Cameroon has qualified boxers for the following events

Men

Athlete	Event	Round of 32	Round of 16	Quarterfinals	Semifinals	Final	
Athlete	Event	Opposition Result	Opposition Result	Opposition Result	Opposition Result	Opposition Result	Rank
Thomas Essomba	Light flyweight	Daraa (MAR); W 13–10	Barnes (IRL); L 10–15	Did not advance			
Yhyacinthe Mewoli Abdon	Lightweight	Gaibnazarov (UZB); L 6–11	Did not advance				
Serge Ambomo	Light welterweight	Sener (TUR); L 10–19	Did not advance				
Christian Donfack Adjoufack	Light heavyweight	Kolling (GER); L 6–15	Did not advance				
Blaise Yepmou Mendouo	Super heavyweight	—	Arjaoui (MAR); L 6–15	Did not advance			

== Football ==
Cameroon has qualified a women's team.

- Women's team – 18 players

=== Women's tournament ===
Team roster

Head coach: Carl Enow

Cameroon named a squad of 18 players and 4 alternates for the tournament.

No.	Pos.	Player	Date of birth (age)	Caps	Goals	Club
1	GK	Annette Ngo Ndom	2 June 1985 (aged 27)	13	0	(Cameroon) Louves Minproff
2	DF	Christine Manie	4 May 1984 (aged 28)	40	6	(Romania) Negrea Reșița
3	FW	Ajara Nchout	12 January 1993 (aged 19)	15	2	(Russia) Energy Voronezh
4	MF	Yvonne Leuko	20 November 1991 (aged 20)	3	0	(France) Montigny-le-Bretonneux
5	DF	Augustine Ejangue	19 January 1989 (aged 23)	22	0	(Russia) Energy Voronezh
6	MF	Francine Zouga	9 November 1987 (aged 24)	23	3	(Switzerland) FSG Aïre-le-Lignon
7	FW	Gabrielle Onguéné	25 February 1989 (aged 23)	0	0	(Cameroon) Louves Minproff
8	MF	Raissa Feudjio	29 October 1995 (aged 16)	11	0	(Cameroon) Lorema
9	FW	Madeleine Ngono Mani	16 October 1983 (aged 28)	42	26	(France) EA Guingamp
10	MF	Bébéy Beyene	10 May 1992 (aged 20)	22	1	(Cameroon) Louves Minproff
11	FW	Adrienne Iven	9 March 1983 (aged 29)	12	2	(Cameroon) Louves Minproff
12	MF	Francoise Bella (captain)	9 March 1983 (aged 29)	53	7	(Nigeria) Rivers Angels
13	DF	Claudine Meffometou	1 July 1990 (aged 22)	8	0	(Cameroon) Franck Rollycek
14	DF	Bibi Medoua	9 August 1993 (aged 18)	19	0	(Cameroon) Locomotive de Yaoundé
15	DF	Ysis Sonkeng	20 September 1989 (aged 22)	30	0	(Cameroon) Louves Minproff
16	MF	Jeannette Yango	12 June 1993 (aged 19)	20	1	(Poland) Katowice
17	FW	Gaëlle Enganamouit	9 June 1992 (aged 20)	17	2	(Serbia) Spartak Subotica
18	GK	Reine Sosso	19 March 1993 (aged 19)	11	0	(Cameroon) Franck Rollycek

Group play

Pos	Team	Pld	W	D	L	GF	GA	GD	Pts	Qualification
1	Great Britain	3	3	0	0	5	0	+5	9	Qualified for the quarter-finals
2	Brazil	3	2	0	1	6	1	+5	6	Qualified for the quarter-finals
3	New Zealand	3	1	0	2	3	3	0	3	Qualified for the quarter-finals
4	Cameroon	3	0	0	3	1	11	−10	0	

Source: IOC
25 July 2012
18:45

Cameroon	0–5	Brazil
	Report	Francielle 7'; Costa 10'; Marta 73' (pen.), 88'; Cristiane 78'

Millennium Stadium, Cardiff
Attendance: 30,847
Referee: Jenny Palmqvist (Sweden)

28 July 2012
17:15

Great Britain	3–0	Cameroon
Stoney 18'; J. Scott 23'; Houghton 82'	Report

Millennium Stadium, Cardiff
Attendance: 31,141
Referee: Hong Eun-ah (South Korea)

31 July 2012
19:45

New Zealand	3–1	Cameroon
Smith 43'; Sonkeng 49' (o.g.); Gregorius 62'	Report	Onguéné 75'

City of Coventry Stadium, Coventry
Attendance: 11,425
Referee: Christina Pedersen (Norway)

== Judo ==
Athlete	Event	Round of 32	Round of 16	Quarterfinals	Semifinals	Repechage	Final / BM	
Athlete	Event	Opposition Result	Opposition Result	Opposition Result	Opposition Result	Opposition Result	Opposition Result	Rank
Dieudonne Dolassem	Men's −90 kg	Liparteliani (GEO); L 0003–0101	Did not advance					

== Rowing ==
Cameroon has qualified the following boats.

Men

Athlete	Event	Heats		Repechage		Quarterfinals		Semifinals		Final	
Athlete	Event	Time	Rank	Time	Rank	Time	Rank	Time	Rank	Time	Rank
Paul Etia Ndoumbe	Single sculls	7:29.77	6 R	7:24.15	5 SE/F	Bye		7:58.48	5 FF	7:46.23	32

Qualification Legend: FA=Final A (medal); FB=Final B (non-medal); FC=Final C (non-medal); FD=Final D (non-medal); FE=Final E (non-medal); FF=Final F (non-medal); SA/B=Semifinals A/B; SC/D=Semifinals C/D; SE/F=Semifinals E/F; QF=Quarterfinals; R=Repechage

== Swimming ==
Cameroon has gained two "Universality places" from the FINA.

Men

Athlete	Event	Heat		Semifinal		Final	
Athlete	Event	Time	Rank	Time	Rank	Time	Rank
Paul Edingue Ekane	50 m freestyle	27.87	54	Did not advance			

Women

Athlete	Event	Heat		Semifinal		Final	
Athlete	Event	Time	Rank	Time	Rank	Time	Rank
Antoinette Guedia Mouafo	50 m freestyle	29.28	53	Did not advance			

== Table tennis ==
One Cameroon athlete qualified to participate.

Athlete	Event	Preliminary round	Round 1	Round 2	Round 3	Round 4	Quarterfinals	Semifinals	Final / BM	
Athlete	Event	Opposition Result	Opposition Result	Opposition Result	Opposition Result	Opposition Result	Opposition Result	Opposition Result	Opposition Result	Rank
Sarah Hanffou	Women's singles	Moumjoghlian (LIB); W 4–0	Xian (FRA); L 1–4	Did not advance						

== Weightlifting ==
Two weightlifters from Cameroon qualified for the Olympics; 1 man and 1 woman. Madias Nzesso originally finished sixth in her event, but after all three medalists were disqualified for doping offenses, she was promoted to a bronze medal.

Athlete	Event	Snatch		Clean & Jerk		Total	Rank
Athlete	Event	Result	Rank	Result	Rank	Total	Rank
Frederic Fokejou Tefot	Men's +105 kg	160	17	202	16	362	16
Madias Nzesso	Women's −75 kg	115	3	131	3	246	3rd place, bronze medalist(s)

== Wrestling ==
Cameroon qualified one athlete through a quota place.

Key:

- VT - Victory by Fall.
- PP - Decision by Points - the loser with technical points.
- PO - Decision by Points - the loser without technical points.

Women's freestyle

Athlete	Event	Qualification	Round of 16	Quarterfinals	Semifinals	Repechage 1	Repechage 2	Final / BM	
Athlete	Event	Opposition Result	Opposition Result	Opposition Result	Opposition Result	Opposition Result	Opposition Result	Opposition Result	Rank
Annabelle Ali	−72 kg	Bye	Soloniaina (MAD); W 5–0 ^{VT}	Zlateva (BUL); L 1–3 ^{PP}	Did not advance	Bye	Marzaliuk (BLR); L 0–3 ^{PO}	Did not advance	7

== See also ==
- Cameroon at the 2012 Summer Paralympics
