= Mauritius at the 2012 Summer Olympics =

- IOC code: MRI
- NOC: Mauritius Olympic Committee

in London
- Competitors: 11 in 7 sports
- Flag bearer: Natacha Rigobert
- Medals: Gold 0 Silver 0 Bronze 0 Total 0

Summer Olympics appearances (overview)
- 1984; 1988; 1992; 1996; 2000; 2004; 2008; 2012; 2016; 2020; 2024

Mauritius competed its eighth consecutive Olympiad at the 2012 Summer Olympics in London, from 27 July to 12 August 2012.

The nation had a contingent of 11 athletes, four men and seven women, to represent the nation in seven different sports. Mauritius did not win a medal, ending a streak started at the 2004 Summer Olympics in Athens, Greece.

== Background ==
Mauritius made their Olympic debut at the 1984 Summer Olympics in Los Angeles, California, United States and they had appeared at every Summer Olympics since. The 2012 Summer Olympics in London, England, United Kingdom marked Mauritius' eighth appearance at a Summer Olympics. Prior to 2012, Mauritius had won medals at the previous two games – the 2004 Summer Olympics in Athens, Greece and the 2008 Summer Olympics in Beijing, China.

== Competitors ==
In total, 11 athletes represented Mauritius at the 2012 Summer Olympics in London, England, United Kingdom across seven different sports.

Sport	Men	Women	Total
Athletics	1	1	2
Boxing	2	0	2
Cycling	0	1	1
Judo	0	1	1
Swimming	1	1	2
Triathlon	0	1	1
Volleyball	0	2	2
Total	4	7	11

== Athletics ==
In total, two Mauritian athletes participated in the athletics events – Fabrice Coiffic in the men's 100 m and Annabelle Lascar in the women's 800 m.

Men

Athlete	Event	Heat		Quarterfinal		Semifinal		Final	
Athlete	Event	Result	Rank	Result	Rank	Result	Rank	Result	Rank
Fabrice Coiffic	100 m	10.62	1 Q	10.59	7	Did not advance			

Women

Athlete	Event	Heat		Semifinal		Final	
Athlete	Event	Result	Rank	Result	Rank	Result	Rank
Annabelle Lascar	800 m	2:05.45	5	Did not advance			

== Boxing ==
In total, two Mauritian athletes participated in the boxing events – Richarno Colin in the men's light welterweight category and Oliver Lavigilante in the men's flyweight category.

Athlete	Event	Round of 32	Round of 16	Quarterfinals	Semifinals	Final	
Athlete	Event	Opposition Result	Opposition Result	Opposition Result	Opposition Result	Opposition Result	Rank
Oliver Lavigilante	Flyweight	Micah (GHA); L 14–18	Did not advance				
Richarno Colin	Light welterweight	Aatakni (MAR); W 16–10	Mönkh-Erdene (MGL); L 12–15	Did not advance			

== Cycling ==
In total, one Mauritian athlete participated in the cycling events – Aurelie Halbwachs in the women's road race.

Athlete	Event	Time	Rank
Aurelie Halbwachs	Women's road race	Did not finish	

== Judo ==
In total, one Mauritian athlete participated in the judo events – Christiane Legentil in the women's −52 kg category.

Athlete	Event	Round of 32	Round of 16	Quarterfinals	Semifinals	Repechage	Final / BM	
Athlete	Event	Opposition Result	Opposition Result	Opposition Result	Opposition Result	Opposition Result	Opposition Result	Rank
Christiane Legentil	Women's −52 kg	Bye	Kelmendi (ALB); W 1001–0101	Heylen (BEL); L 0002–0020	Did not advance	Müller (LUX); L 0002–0101	Did not advance	7

== Swimming ==
In total, two Mauritian athletes participated in the swimming events – Heather Arseth in the women's 200 m freestyle and Mathieu Marquet in the men's 200 m freestyle.

Men

Athlete	Event	Heat		Semifinal		Final	
Athlete	Event	Time	Rank	Time	Rank	Time	Rank
Mathieu Marquet	200 m freestyle	1:58.91	39	Did not advance			

Women

Athlete	Event	Heat		Semifinal		Final	
Athlete	Event	Time	Rank	Time	Rank	Time	Rank
Heather Arseth	200 m freestyle	2:07.81	34	Did not advance			

== Triathlon ==
In total, one Mauritian athlete participated in the triathlon events – Fabienne St. Louis in the women's race.

Athlete	Event	Swim (1.5 km)	Trans 1	Bike (40 km)	Trans 2	Run (10 km)	Total Time	Rank
Fabienne St. Louis	Women's	19:51	0:39	1:06:54	0:35	39:38	2:07:37	42

== Volleyball ==
In total, two Mauritian athletes participated in the volleyball events – Elodie Li Yuk Lo and Natacha Rigobert in the beach volleyball women's tournament.

Athlete	Event	Preliminary round	Standing	Round of 16	Quarterfinals	Semifinals	Final / BM	
Athlete	Event	Opposition Score	Standing	Opposition Score	Opposition Score	Opposition Score	Opposition Score	Rank
Elodie Li Yuk Lo; Natacha Rigobert	Women's	Pool A Juliana – Larissa (BRA); L 0 – 2 (5–21, 10–21); Háječková – Klapalová (CZE); L 0 – 2 (10–21, 11–21); Holtwick – Semmler (GER); L 0 – 2 (11–21, 10–21)	4	Did not advance				19
