= Boxing at the 2011 Arab Games =

Boxing competitions

Boxing at the 2011 Pan Arab Games
- Venue: Aspire Zone
- Location: Doha, Qatar

At the 2011 Pan Arab Games, the boxing events were held at Aspire Zone in Doha, Qatar from 14 to 21 December. A total of 10 events were contested.

== Medal summary ==
=== Men ===
Event	Gold	Silver	Bronze
Light Fly (-49 kg)	Hasan Naser (IRQ)	Abdallah Sham'On (JOR)	Yahya Al-Rafiq (YEM)
Light Fly (-49 kg)	Hasan Naser (IRQ)	Abdallah Sham'On (JOR)	Ahmed Meziane (ALG)
Fly (-52 kg)	Mohammad Alwadi (JOR)	Hasham Abdelaal (EGY)	Yassine Lakhal (MAR)
Fly (-52 kg)	Mohammad Alwadi (JOR)	Hasham Abdelaal (EGY)	Bilel M'Hamdi (TUN)
Bantam (-56 kg)	Aboubakr Saddik Lbida (MAR)	Ammar Hasan (IRQ)	Reda Benbaziz (ALG)
Bantam (-56 kg)	Aboubakr Saddik Lbida (MAR)	Ammar Hasan (IRQ)	Mohamed Hassan (EGY)
Light (-60 kg)	Ahmed Mejri (TUN)	Suraki Al-Waaily (IRQ)	Othman Arbabi (QAT)
Light (-60 kg)	Ahmed Mejri (TUN)	Suraki Al-Waaily (IRQ)	Mahdi Ouatine (MAR)
Light Welter (-64 kg)	Abdelhak Aatakni (MAR)	Sid Ali Berrag (ALG)	Abderrazak Houya (TUN)
Light Welter (-64 kg)	Abdelhak Aatakni (MAR)	Sid Ali Berrag (ALG)	Ibrahim Saleh (JOR)
Welter (-69 kg)	Mehdi Khalsi (MAR)	Hosam Abdin (EGY)	Zohir Kedache (ALG)
Welter (-69 kg)	Mehdi Khalsi (MAR)	Hosam Abdin (EGY)	Zaidon Rabeah (IRQ)
Middle (-75 kg)	Mohamed Hikal (EGY)	Badr-Eddine Haddioui (MAR)	Wesam Alalawi (KSA)
Middle (-75 kg)	Mohamed Hikal (EGY)	Badr-Eddine Haddioui (MAR)	Saad Kadous (ALG)
Light Heavy (-81 kg)	Yahia El-Mekachari (TUN)	Elmohamady Elalfy (EGY)	Ahmad Alteimat (JOR)
Light Heavy (-81 kg)	Yahia El-Mekachari (TUN)	Elmohamady Elalfy (EGY)	Abubaker Asheit (SUD)
Heavy (-91 kg)	Ihab Almatbouli (JOR)	Abdelatif Sahnoune (ALG)	Karem Elghanam (EGY)
Super Heavy (+91 kg)	Mohammed Arjaoui (MAR)	Aymen Trabelsi (TUN)	Nawshirwan Barziinji (IRQ)
Super Heavy (+91 kg)	Mohammed Arjaoui (MAR)	Aymen Trabelsi (TUN)	Kamel Rahmani (ALG)

== Medal table ==
* Host nation (Qatar)

Rank	Nation	Gold	Silver	Bronze	Total
1	Morocco	4	1	2	7
2	Jordan	2	1	2	5
2	Tunisia	2	1	2	5
4	Egypt	1	3	2	6
5	Iraq	1	2	2	5
6	Algeria	0	2	5	7
7	Qatar*	0	0	1	1
7	Saudi Arabia	0	0	1	1
7	Sudan	0	0	1	1
7	Yemen	0	0	1	1
Totals (10 entries)		10	10	19	39
