= Mujandjae Kasuto =

Namibian boxer (born 1985)

Personal information
- Full name: Mujandjae Kasuto
- Nationality: Namibia
- Born: 25 November 1985 (age 40)
- Height: 1.78 m (5 ft 10 in)
- Weight: 75 kg (165 lb)

Sport
- Sport: Boxing
- Weight class: Middleweight

Mujandjae Kasuto (born 25 November 1985) is a Namibian amateur boxer who has competed twice at the Olympics.

At the Commonwealth Games 2006 he lost early at junior welterweight (-64 kg).

Kasuto competed for Namibia at the 2008 Summer Olympics in boxing at welterweight (-69 kg) after qualifying for the Games by winning his division at the qualifying tournament held in Windhoek in March 2008. At the 2008 Games, Kasuto lost in the round of 32 to Russia's Andrey Balanov.

At the Commonwealth Games 2010 he lost to Northern Irishman Patrick Gallagher.

At the All Africa Games 2011 he competed at middleweight (-75 kg) but lost to Felix Mwamba.

At the Olympic qualifier he qualified for the Olympics at middleweight, beating fighters like Abdelmalek Rahou although he lost the final to local Badreddine Haddioui.

At the 2012 Summer Olympics, he beat Sobirjon Nazarov but lost to Zoltán Harcsa in the second round.

At the 2014 Commonwealth Games he again competed at middleweight, reaching the last 16 where he lost to India's Vijender Vijender.
