= Boxing at the 2012 Summer Olympics – Men's bantamweight =

Men's bantamweight boxing at the Games of the XXX Olympiad
- Venue: ExCeL Exhibition Centre
- Date: 28 July to 11 August 2012
- Competitors: 28 from 28 nations

Medalists
1st place, gold medalist(s)		Luke Campbell	Great Britain
2nd place, silver medalist(s)		John Joe Nevin	Ireland
3rd place, bronze medalist(s)		Lázaro Álvarez	Cuba
3rd place, bronze medalist(s)		Satoshi Shimizu	Japan

The men's bantamweight boxing competition at the 2012 Olympic Games in London was held from 28 July to 11 August at the ExCeL Exhibition Centre.

Twenty-eight boxers from 28 nations competed. Luke Campbell of Great Britain won the gold medal, defeating Ireland's John Joe Nevin in the final. Nevin took the silver medal and bronze medals were awarded to both semi-final losers.

== Competition format ==
Like all Olympic boxing events, the competition was a straight single-elimination tournament. The competition consisted of 28 boxers who had qualified through various qualifying tournaments held in 2011 and 2012. The competition began with a preliminary round on 28 July, where the number of competitors was reduced to 16, and concluded with a final on 11 August. As there were less than 32 boxers in the competition a number of boxers received a bye for the preliminary round. Both semi-final losers were awarded bronze medals, so no boxers competed again after their first loss.

All bouts comprised three three-minute periods where the boxers received points for every successful punch they could land on their opponent's head or upper body. The boxer with the most points at the end of the bouts won. If a boxer was knocked to the ground and cannot get up before the referee counts to 10 then the bout is over and the opponent wins.

== Schedule ==
All times are British Summer Time (UTC+1)

Date	Time	Round
Saturday 28 July 2012	13:30 & 20:30	Round of 32
Wednesday 1 August 2012	13:30 & 20:30	Round of 16
Sunday 5 August 2012	20:30	Quarter-finals
Friday 10 August 2012	14:00	Semi-finals
Saturday 11 August 2012	20:45	Final

== Results ==
=== Finals ===
Semi-finals
Lázaro Álvarez (CUB)	14
John Joe Nevin (IRL)	19
Luke Campbell (GBR)	20
Satoshi Shimizu (JPN)	11

Final
John Joe Nevin (IRL)	11
Luke Campbell (GBR)	14

=== Top half ===
Round of 32
Joseph Diaz (USA)	19
Pavlo Ishchenko (UKR)	9
Sergey Vodopiyanov (RUS)	12
Alberto Melián (ARG)	5
Robenílson de Jesus (BRA)	13
Orzubek Shayimov (UZB)	7
John Joe Nevin (IRL)	21
Dennis Ceylan (DEN)	6
Kanat Abutalipov (KAZ)	15
Wessam Salamana (SYR)	7
Shiva Thapa (IND)	9
Óscar Valdez (MEX)	14

Round of 16
Lázaro Álvarez (CUB)	21
Joseph Diaz (USA)	15
Sergey Vodopiyanov (RUS)	11
Robenílson de Jesus (BRA)	13
John Joe Nevin (IRL)	15
Kanat Abutalipov (KAZ)	10
Óscar Valdez (MEX)	13
Anvar Yunusov (TJK)	7

Quarter-finals
Lázaro Álvarez (CUB)	16
Robenílson de Jesus (BRA)	11
John Joe Nevin (IRL)	19
Óscar Valdez (MEX)	13

Semi-finals
Lázaro Álvarez (CUB)	14
John Joe Nevin (IRL)	19

=== Bottom half ===
Round of 32
Jonas Matheus (NAM)	7
Vittorio Parrinello (ITA)	18
Ibrahim Balla (AUS)	16+
Aboubakr Lbida (MAR)	16
Ayabonga Sonjica (RSA)	6
Detelin Dalakliev (BUL)	15
Merab Turkadze (GEO)
Mohamed Ouadahi (ALG)	WO
William Encarnación (DOM)	15
Romeo Lemboumba (GAB)	6
Isaac Dogboe (GHA)	9
Satoshi Shimizu (JPN)	10

Round of 16
Luke Campbell (GBR)	11
Vittorio Parrinello (ITA)	9
Ibrahim Balla (AUS)	10
Detelin Dalakliev (BUL)	14
Mohamed Ouadahi (ALG)	16
William Encarnación (DOM)	10
Satoshi Shimizu (JPN)	RSC
Magomed Abdulhamidov (AZE)

Quarter-finals
Luke Campbell (GBR)	16
Detelin Dalakliev (BUL)	15
Mohamed Ouadahi (ALG)	15
Satoshi Shimizu (JPN)	17

Semi-finals
Luke Campbell (GBR)	20
Satoshi Shimizu (JPN)	11
