= 2012 Summer Olympics Parade of Nations =

At the 2012 Summer Olympics Parade of Nations of the 2012 London Olympics, athletes and officials from each participating country paraded into the Olympic Stadium preceded by their national flag to the sound of iconic British modern music. Each flag bearer was chosen by each nation's National Olympic Committee or by the delegation of athletes.

== Parade order ==
By tradition and IOC guidelines, Greece entered first, as the nation of origin of the ancient and the host of the 1896 Summer Olympics modern Olympic Games. The host nation Great Britain (as the United Kingdom is recognised at the Games) brought up the end of the procession. The other nations followed Greece in alphabetical order by name in the language of the host country (English) except for a few instances. As each national delegation entered accompanied by music, the national name was announced in French and English (the official languages of the Olympics).

National name exceptions included shortened, more formal or alternative names, sometimes due to political or naming disputes. The then called Republic of Macedonia entered using part of its UN recognised name "Former Yugoslav Republic of Macedonia" because of the naming dispute with Greece. The Republic of China (commonly known as Taiwan) entered with the compromised name and flag of "Chinese Taipei" under T so that they did not enter together with conflicting People's Republic of China (commonly known as China), which entered as the "People's Republic of China" under C. The Republic of the Congo entered as just "Congo" while the Democratic Republic of the Congo entered with its full name. Similarly South Korea entered as "Republic of Korea" under K while North Korea entered as "Democratic People's Republic of Korea". The British Virgin Islands entered under B while the United States Virgin Islands entered as simply the "Virgin Islands", under V. Iran, Micronesia, Moldova, Laos, Brunei and the United States all entered under their formal names, respectively "Islamic Republic of Iran", "Federated States of Micronesia", "Republic of Moldova", "Lao People's Democratic Republic", "Brunei Darussalam" and "United States of America". For the first time in many years, Libyan athletes marched as "Libya", and not "Libyan Arab Jamahiriya" as Libya was known during the reign of Muammar Gaddafi.

== Parade ==
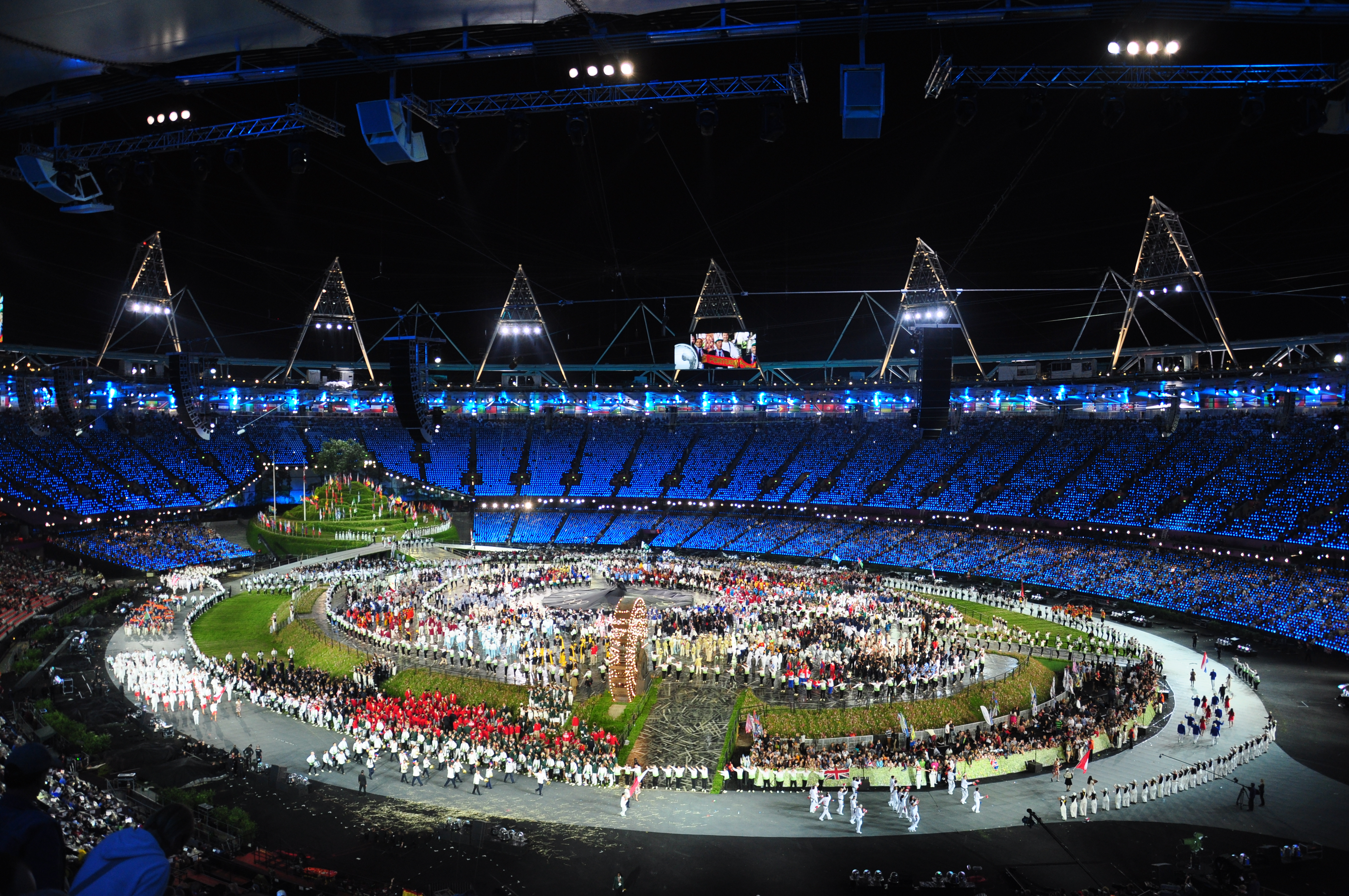
The Nations entering the Olympic Stadium

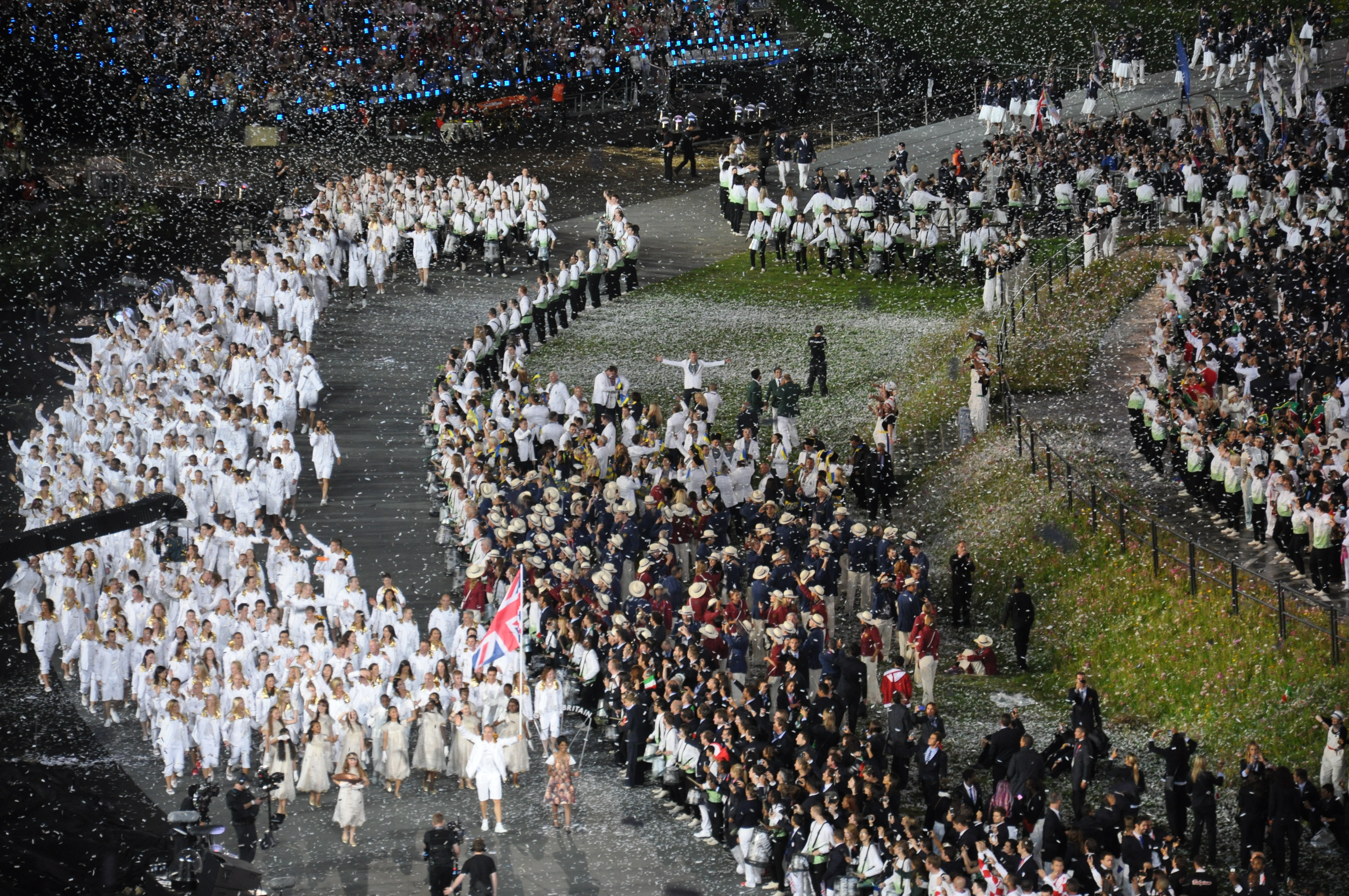
Great Britain entering the Olympic Stadium as the host country

Each delegation was led by a flagbearer (listed below), accompanied by a child volunteer carrying a copper petal (camera-left) and a young lady carrying a sign with the country's English name (camera-right). The copper petal was engraved with the name of the nation and would later be used to build the cauldron for the Olympic flame. The volunteer carrying the sign wore a dress constructed with fabric imprinted with images of Olympic volunteers, including those who had not been chosen. Each nation's flag was planted as it arrived at the model of Glastonbury Tor.

Netherlands Antilles was ineligible to participate independently in the parade, as its National Olympic Committee was unrecognised by the IOC due to the 2010 dissolution of the Netherlands Antilles. Team Dutch Antilleans paraded by default under the Olympic flag, together with a South Sudanese runner whose newly independent country did not yet have an Olympic committee.

Notable were the debut female Olympic athletes from Saudi Arabia, Qatar and Brunei.

The Team India entered the stadium jointly led by a woman dressed in a red top and blue trousers, who was not part of its team. In India this incident received media attention, but London officials downplayed concerns saying that she was Madhura Nagendra, a volunteer who had been security screened. Some media outlets later identified her as Madhura Honey, a graduate of Communications and Media Studies from Christ College in Bangalore. The Indian team's acting chef-de-mission Muralidharan Raja filed a protest with organisers.

== Countries and flagbearers ==
Below is a list of parading countries and their announced flag bearer, in the same order as the parade. This is sortable by country name, flag bearer's name, or flag bearer's sport. Names are given in the form officially designated by the IOC.

Order	Country	Flag bearer	Sport
1	Greece	Alexandros Nikolaidis	Taekwondo
2	Afghanistan	Nesar Ahmad Bahave	Taekwondo
3	Albania	Romela Begaj	Weightlifting
4	Algeria	Abdelhafid Benchabla	Boxing
5	American Samoa	Ching Maou Wei	Swimming
6	Andorra	Joan Tomàs Roca	Shooting
7	Angola	Antonia Moreira	Judo
8	Antigua and Barbuda	Daniel Bailey	Athletics
9	Argentina	Luciana Aymar	Field hockey
10	Armenia	Arman Yeremyan	Taekwondo
11	Aruba	Jemal Le Grand	Swimming
12	Australia	Lauren Jackson	Basketball
13	Austria	Markus Rogan	Swimming
14	Azerbaijan	Elnur Mammadli	Judo
15	Bahamas	Chris Brown	Athletics
16	Bahrain	Azza Al Qasmi	Shooting
17	Bangladesh	Mahfizur Rahman Sagor	Swimming
18	Barbados	Ryan Brathwaite	Athletics
19	Belarus	Max Mirnyi	Tennis
20	Belgium	Tia Hellebaut	Athletics
21	Belize	Kenneth Medwood	Athletics
22	Benin	Jacob Gnahoui	Judo
23	Bermuda	Zander Kirkland	Sailing
24	Bhutan	Sherab Zam	Archery
25	Bolivia	Karen Torrez	Swimming
26	Bosnia and Herzegovina	Amel Mekić	Judo
27	Botswana	Amantle Montsho	Athletics
28	Brazil	Rodrigo Pessoa	Equestrian
29	British Virgin Islands	Tahesia Harrigan	Athletics
30	Brunei Darussalam (BRU)	Maziah Mahusin	Athletics
31	Bulgaria	Yordan Yovchev	Gymnastics
32	Burkina Faso	Severine Nebie	Judo
33	Burundi	Diane Nukuri	Athletics
34	Cambodia	Sorn Davin	Taekwondo
35	Cameroon	Annabelle Ali	Wrestling
36	Canada	Simon Whitfield	Triathlon
37	Cape Verde	Adysângela Moniz	Judo
38	Cayman Islands	Kemar Hyman	Athletics
39	Central African Republic	David Boui	Taekwondo
40	Chad	Carine Ngarlemdana	Judo
41	Chile	Denisse van Lamoen	Archery
42	People's Republic of China (CHN)	Yi Jianlian	Basketball
43	Colombia	Mariana Pajón	Cycling
44	Comoros	Ahamada Feta	Athletics
45	Congo (CGO)	Lorène Bazolo	Athletics
46	Cook Islands	Helema Williams	Sailing
47	Costa Rica	Gabriela Traña	Athletics
48	Côte d'Ivoire (CIV)	Ben Youssef Meite	Athletics
49	Croatia	Venio Losert	Handball
50	Cuba	Mijaín López	Wrestling
51	Cyprus	Marcos Baghdatis	Tennis
52	Czech Republic	Petr Koukal	Badminton
53	Democratic People's Republic of Korea (PRK)	Pak Song-Chol	Athletics
54	Democratic Republic of the Congo (COD)	Ilunga Mande Zatara	Athletics
55	Denmark	Kim Wraae Knudsen	Canoeing
56	Djibouti	Zourah Ali	Athletics
57	Dominica	Erison Hurtault	Athletics
58	Dominican Republic	Gabriel Mercedes	Taekwondo
59	Ecuador	César de Cesare	Canoeing
60	Egypt	Hesham Mesbah	Judo
61	El Salvador	Evelyn García	Cycling
62	Equatorial Guinea	Bibiana Olama	Athletics
63	Eritrea	Weynay Ghebresilasie	Athletics
64	Estonia	Aleksander Tammert	Athletics
65	Ethiopia	Yanet Seyoum	Swimming
66	Fiji	Josateki Naulu	Judo
67	Finland	Hanna-Maria Seppälä	Swimming
68	Former Yugoslav Republic of Macedonia (MKD)	Marko Blaževski	Swimming
69	France	Laura Flessel-Colovic	Fencing
70	Gabon	Ruddy Zang Milama	Athletics
71	Gambia (GAM)	Suwaibou Sanneh	Athletics
72	Georgia	Nino Salukvadze	Shooting
73	Germany	Natascha Keller	Field hockey
74	Ghana	Maxwell Amponsah	Boxing
75	Grenada	Kirani James	Athletics
76	Guam	Maria Dunn	Wrestling
77	Guatemala	Juan Ignacio Maegli	Sailing
78	Guinea	Facinet Keita	Judo
79	Guinea-Bissau	Augusto Midana	Wrestling
80	Guyana	Winston George	Athletics
81	Haiti	Linouse Desravine	Judo
82	Honduras	Ronald Bennett	Athletics
83	Hong Kong, China (HKG)	Lee Wai Sze	Cycling
84	Hungary	Péter Biros	Water polo
85	Iceland	Ásdís Hjálmsdóttir	Athletics
86	Independent Olympic Athletes (Note: Athletes from the now-defunct Netherlands Antilles competed under the Olympic flag, as did an athlete from South Sudan, which had not at the time formed an Olympic committee.)	Brooklyn Kerlin	LOCOG/Games Maker
87	India (Note: As discussed above, the team was accompanied by a 'mystery' woman dressed in red.)	Sushil Kumar	Wrestling
88	Indonesia	I Gede Siman Sudartawa	Swimming
89	Islamic Republic of Iran (IRI)	Ali Mazaheri	Boxing
90	Iraq	Dana Hussain	Athletics
91	Ireland	Katie Taylor	Boxing
92	Israel	Shahar Tzuberi	Sailing
93	Italy	Valentina Vezzali	Fencing
94	Jamaica	Usain Bolt	Athletics
95	Japan	Saori Yoshida	Wrestling
96	Jordan	Nadin Dawani	Taekwondo
97	Kazakhstan	Nurmakhan Tinaliyev	Wrestling
98	Kenya	Jason Dunford	Swimming
99	Kiribati	David Katoatau	Weightlifting
100	Republic of Korea (KOR)	Yoon Kyung-shin	Handball
101	Kuwait	Fehaid Al-Deehani	Shooting
102	Kyrgyzstan	Chingiz Mamedov	Judo
103	Lao People's Democratic Republic (LAO)	Kilakone Siphonexay	Athletics
104	Latvia	Mārtiņš Pļaviņš	Beach volleyball
105	Lebanon	Andrea Paoli	Taekwondo
106	Lesotho	Mamorallo Tjoka	Athletics
107	Liberia	Phobay Kutu-Akoi	Athletics
108	Libya	Sofyan El Gadi	Swimming
109	Liechtenstein	Stephanie Vogt	Tennis
110	Lithuania	Virgilijus Alekna	Athletics
111	Luxembourg	Marie Muller	Judo
112	Madagascar	Fetra Ratsimiziva	Judo
113	Malawi	Mike Tebulo	Athletics
114	Malaysia	Pandelela Rinong	Diving
115	Maldives	Mohamed Ajfan Rasheed	Badminton
116	Mali	Rahamatou Drame	Athletics
117	Malta	William Chetcuti	Shooting
118	Marshall Islands	Haley Nemra	Athletics
119	Mauritania	Jidou El Moctar	Athletics
120	Mauritius	Natacha Rigobert	Beach volleyball
121	Mexico	María Espinoza	Taekwondo
122	Federated States of Micronesia (FSM)	Manuel Minginfel	Weightlifting
123	Republic of Moldova (MDA)	Dan Olaru	Archery
124	Monaco	Angelique Trinquier	Swimming
125	Mongolia	Ser-Od Bat-Ochir	Athletics
126	Montenegro	Srđan Mrvaljević	Judo
127	Morocco	Wiam Dislam	Taekwondo
128	Mozambique	Kurt Couto	Athletics
129	Myanmar	Zaw Win Thet	Athletics
130	Namibia	Gaby Ahrens	Shooting
131	Nauru	Itte Detenamo	Weightlifting
132	Nepal	Prasiddha Jung Shah	Swimming
133	Netherlands	Dorian van Rijsselberghe	Sailing
134	New Zealand	Nick Willis	Athletics
135	Nicaragua	Osmar Bravo	Boxing
136	Niger	Moustapha Hima	Boxing
137	Nigeria	Sinivie Boltic	Wrestling
138	Norway	Mira Verås Larsen	Canoeing
139	Oman	Ahmed Al-Hatmi	Shooting
140	Pakistan	Sohail Abbas	Field hockey
141	Palau	Rodman Teltull	Athletics
142	Palestine	Maher Abu Remeleh	Judo
143	Panama	Irving Saladino	Athletics
144	Papua New Guinea	Toea Wisil	Athletics
145	Paraguay	Ben Hockin	Swimming
146	Peru	Gladys Tejeda	Athletics
147	Philippines	Hidilyn Diaz	Weightlifting
148	Poland	Agnieszka Radwańska	Tennis
149	Portugal	Telma Monteiro	Judo
150	Puerto Rico	Javier Culson	Athletics
151	Qatar	Bahiya Al-Hamad	Shooting
152	Romania	Horia Tecău	Tennis
153	Russian Federation (RUS)	Maria Sharapova	Tennis
154	Rwanda	Adrien Niyonshuti	Cycling
155	Saint Kitts and Nevis	Kim Collins	Athletics
156	Saint Lucia	Levern Spencer	Athletics
157	Saint Vincent and the Grenadines	Kineke Alexander	Athletics
158	Samoa	Ele Opeloge	Weightlifting
159	San Marino	Alessandra Perilli	Shooting
160	São Tomé and Príncipe (STP)	Lecabela Quaresma	Athletics
161	Saudi Arabia	Sultan Mubarak Al-Dawoodi	Athletics
162	Senegal	Hortense Diédhiou	Judo
163	Serbia	Novak Djokovic	Tennis
164	Seychelles	Dominic Dugasse	Judo
165	Sierra Leone	Ola Sesay	Athletics
166	Singapore	Feng Tianwei	Table tennis
167	Slovakia	Jozef Gönci	Shooting
168	Slovenia	Peter Kauzer	Canoeing
169	Solomon Islands	Jenly Tegu Wini	Weightlifting
170	Somalia	Zamzam Mohamed Farah	Athletics
171	South Africa	Caster Semenya	Athletics
172	Spain	Pau Gasol (Note: Rafael Nadal was originally chosen, but had to withdraw reportedly due to injury.)	Basketball
173	Sri Lanka	Niluka Karunaratne	Badminton
174	Sudan	Ismail Ahmed Ismail	Athletics
175	Suriname	Chinyere Pigot	Swimming
176	Swaziland	Luke Hall	Swimming
177	Sweden	Rolf-Göran Bengtsson	Equestrian
178	Switzerland	Stanislas Wawrinka (Note: Roger Federer was originally chosen, but passed the opportunity to his partner in the doubles.)	Tennis
179	Syrian Arab Republic (SYR)	Majd Eddin Ghazal	Athletics
180	Chinese Taipei	Chen Shih-chieh	Weightlifting
181	Tajikistan	Mavzuna Chorieva	Boxing
182	United Republic of Tanzania (TAN)	Zakia Mrisho Mohamed	Athletics
183	Thailand	Nuttapong Ketin	Swimming
184	Timor-Leste (TLS)	Augusto Ramos Soares	Athletics
185	Togo	Benjamin Boukpeti	Canoeing
186	Tonga	Amini Fonua	Swimming
187	Trinidad and Tobago	Marc Burns	Athletics
188	Tunisia	Heykel Megannem	Handball
189	Turkey	Neslihan Demir Darnel	Volleyball
190	Turkmenistan	Serdar Hudayberdiyev	Boxing
191	Tuvalu	Asenate Manoa	Athletics
192	Uganda	Ganzi Mugula	Swimming
193	Ukraine	Roman Gontiuk	Judo
194	United Arab Emirates	Saeed Al Maktoum	Shooting
195	United States of America (USA)	Mariel Zagunis	Fencing
196	Uruguay	Rodolfo Collazo	Rowing
197	Uzbekistan	Elshod Rasulov	Boxing
198	Vanuatu	Anolyn Lulu	Table tennis
199	Venezuela	Fabiola Ramos	Table tennis
200	Vietnam	Nguyễn Tiến Nhật	Fencing
201	Virgin Islands	Tabarie Henry	Athletics
202	Yemen	Tameem Al-Kubati	Taekwondo
203	Zambia	Prince Mumba	Athletics
204	Zimbabwe	Kirsty Coventry	Swimming
205	Great Britain	Chris Hoy	Cycling
