= Muideen =

- Gender: Male
- Language: Arabic

Origin
- Word/name: Arab
- Meaning: Someone who is a guide of the religion of Islam

Muideen is a Nigerian masculine given name. The name Muideen is of Arabic origin and means 'Someone who is a guide of the religion of Islam'.Notable people with the name include:

- Muideen Akanji (born 1992), Nigerian boxer
- Muideen Ganiyu (born 1987), Nigerian boxer
