= Benson Gicharu =

Kenyan boxer (born 1985)

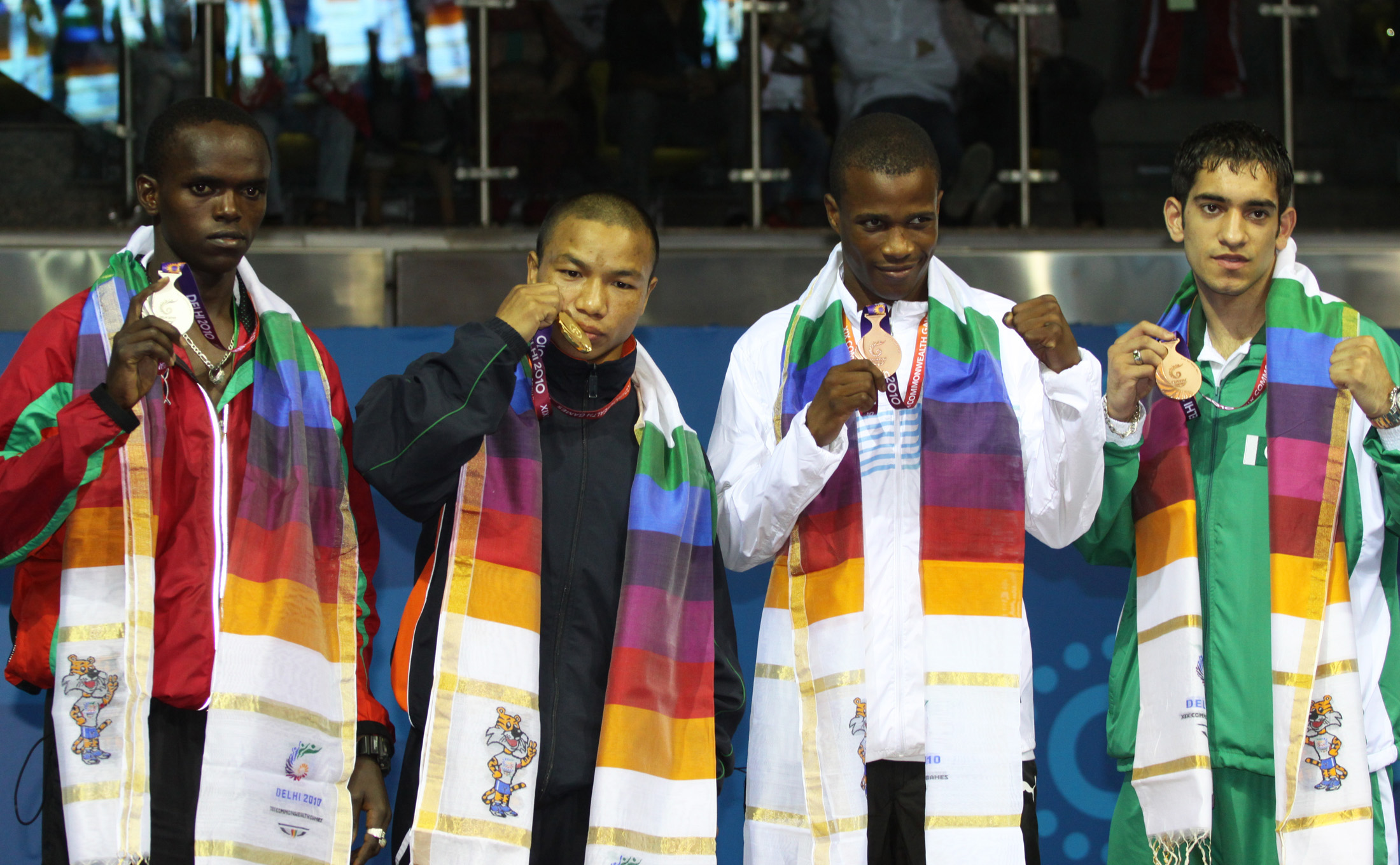
- Benson Gicharu (first from left) at the 2010 Commonwealth Games

Personal information
- Full name: Benson Gicharu Njangiru
- Nationality: Kenya
- Born: 3 May 1985 (age 41) Nairobi, Kenya
- Height: 1.67 m (5 ft 5 1/2 in)

Sport
- Sport: Boxing
- Weight class: Flyweight; Bantamweight
Medal record
Men's Boxing
Representing Kenya
Commonwealth Games
Silver medal – second place	2010 Delhi	Flyweight
Bronze medal – third place	2014 Glasgow	Bantamweight

Benson Gicharu Njangiru (born 3 May 1985) is a Kenyan amateur boxer who won silver at the 2010 Commonwealth Games in Delhi (at flyweight), a bronze medal at the 2014 Commonwealth Games (at bantamweight) and qualified for the 2012 Olympics (at flyweight). His occupation is police officer.

In the 2010 Commonwealth Games, he lost to Suranjoy Mayengbam in the final.

At the 2011 All-Africa Games Oteng won the rematch 10:8 and went on to win the title

At the 2012 African Boxing Olympic Qualification Tournament Oteng won the rubber match but Gicharu qualified for the Olympics anyway. At the 2012 Summer Olympics (results) he lost his first bout 16:19 to Egyptian Hesham Abdelaal.

At the 2014 Commonwealth Games, he competed in the bantamweight division, losing to England's Qais Ashfaq in the semi-final.
