= Ahmed Mejri =

Tunisian boxer (born 1990)

Personal information
- Native name: أحمد الماجري
- Born: January 2, 1990 (age 36) Tunis, Tunisia
- Height: 1.72 m (5 ft 8 in)
- Weight: 60 kg (132 lb)

Sport
- Club: Cite Nationale Sportive
Medal record
Men's boxing
Representing Tunisia
African Championships
Bronze medal – third place	2015 Casablanca	Lightweight
All-Africa Games
Gold medal – first place	2011 Maputo	Lightweight
Pan Arab Games
Gold medal – first place	2011 Doha	Lightweight

Ahmed Mejri (Arabic: أحمد الماجري; born January 2, 1990) is a Tunisian lightweight amateur boxer who won the 2011 All-Africa Games.

He also won the 2012 African Boxing Olympic Qualification Tournament in his weight class. At the 2012 Summer Olympics he beat Shafiq Chitou then lost to Felix Verdejo 7:16.
