= Isaac Dogboe =

Ghanaian boxer (born 1994)

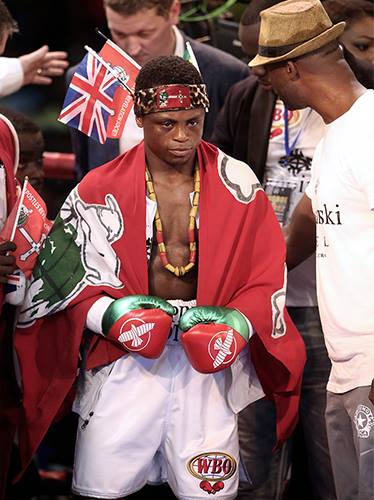

Personal information
- Nickname: Royal Storm
- Nationality: British
- Born: Isaac Zion Dogboe; 26 September 1994 (age 32) Accra, Ghana
- Height: 5 ft 2 in (157 cm)
- Weight: Super-bantamweight; Featherweight

Boxing career
- Reach: 64 in (163 cm)
- Stance: Orthodox

Boxing record
- Total fights: 28
- Wins: 24
- Win by KO: 16
- Losses: 4

Isaac Zion Dogboe (/ˈdɒɡbeɪ/ DOG-bay; born 26 September 1994) is a Ghanaian-born British professional boxer who held the WBO junior-featherweight title in 2018.

== Background ==
Dogboe was born in Accra, Ghana, but moved to London, England.

== Amateur career ==
Dogboe won the 2013 Amateur Boxing Association British lightweight title, when boxing out of the Territorial Army London BC.

He qualified for the 2012 Olympics by winning a silver medal at the African Olympic Qualifying Event, beating Mohamed Bedir (EGY), Emilian Polino (TAN), Ayabonga Sonjica (RSA) and only losing on countback after a 6:6 draw in the final to Aboubakr Lbida (MAR).

In the first round of the 2012 Olympics he faced Satoshi Shimizu of Japan. Ahead on points in the first two rounds (4:3, 3:2) he lost the bout after the judges scored round three 5:2 in favour of Shimizu, overturning Dogboe's lead. The verdict was met with vocal displeasure from ringside spectators and was later described as "contentious" and a "mystery decision" by media outlets.

== Professional career ==
After turning professional in 2013, he compiled a record of 17–0 before challenging Cesar Juarez for the vacant WBO interim junior-featherweight title, winning via fifth-round stoppage. In his next fight Dogboe would face and beat Jessie Magdaleno to capture the full WBO junior-featherweight title.

He successfully defending his WBO title with a first-round knockout against Hidenori Otake on 25 August 2018 at the Gila River Arena in Glendale, US. Dogboe knocked the ageing Otake down twice before referee Patrick Morley stepped in to prevent Otake from taking further punishment.

He lost his WBO title to Emanuel Navarrete at the Hulu Theater in New York City's Madison Square Garden on 8 December 2018. All three judges scored the fight in Navarrete's favor. On 11 May 2019, the pair fought a rematch, and Dogboe lost once again, this time by twelfth-round technical knockout.

=== Break from boxing ===
He confirmed after his second bout with Navarrete that he would be taking a break from the sport. This would make it possible for him to continue to study for his bachelor's degree, which he had to defer due to the demanding nature of his career as a boxer.

=== Return ===
On 5 September 2019, it was announced that Dogboe would be facing Carl Frampton in his featherweight debut. However, the fight did not come to fruition.

He is promoted by Bob Arum's Top Rank. He made a comeback against Mexican American Chris Avalos in July 2020, after stopping him in the final round of their featherweight bout at the MGM Grand. In June 2021, he defeated Adam Lopez in a featherweight bout in Las Vegas with two out of the three judges scoring the fight in his favor. That was the first time he fought with Barry Hunter as his trainer. In November 2021, he defeated Christopher Diaz on the undercard of the Terence Crawford and Shawn Porter bout in Las Vegas.

On 23 July 2022, Dogboe defeated Joet Gonzalez via split decision at Grand Casino in Hinckley, Minnesota, to win the WBO International featherweight title.

He faced Robeisy Ramírez for the vacant WBO featherweight title at Hard Rock Hotel and Casino in Tulsa, Oklahoma, on 1 April 2023, losing by unanimous decision.

In a final eliminator for a shot at the WBC featherweight title, Dogboe lost via unanimous decision to future world champion, Nick Ball, at Manchester Arena in Manchester, England, on 18 November 2023.

== Professional boxing record ==
28 fights	24 wins	4 losses
By knockout	16	1
By decision	8	3

No.	Result	Record	Opponent	Type	Round, time	Date	Location	Notes
28	Loss	24–4	Nick Ball	UD	12	18 Nov 2023	Manchester Arena, England	
27	Loss	24–3	Robeisy Ramírez	UD	12	1 Apr 2023	Hard Rock Hotel & Casino, Tulsa, Oklahoma, US	For vacant WBO featherweight title
26	Win	24–2	Joet Gonzalez	SD	10	23 Jul 2022	Grand Casino, Hinckley, Minnesota, U.S.	Won WBO International featherweight title
25	Win	23–2	Christopher Diaz	MD	10	20 Nov 2021	Michelob Ultra Arena, Paradise, Nevada, U.S.	Retained NABF featherweight title
24	Win	22–2	Adam Lopez	MD	10	19 Jun 2021	Virgin Hotels Las Vegas, Paradise, Nevada, US	Won NABF featherweight title
23	Win	21–2	Chris Avalos	TKO	8 (8), 2:25	21 Jul 2020	MGM Grand Las Vegas, Paradise, Nevada, US	
22	Loss	20–2	Emanuel Navarrete	TKO	12 (12), 2:02	11 May 2019	Convention Center, Tucson, Arizona, US	For WBO junior-featherweight title
21	Loss	20–1	Emanuel Navarrete	UD	12	8 Dec 2018	Hulu Theater, New York City, New York, US	Lost WBO junior-featherweight title
20	Win	20–0	Hidenori Otake	TKO	1 (12), 2:18	25 Aug 2018	Gila River Arena, Glendale, Arizona, US	Retained WBO junior-featherweight title
19	Win	19–0	Jessie Magdaleno	TKO	11 (12), 1:38	28 Apr 2018	Liacouras Center, Philadelphia, Pennsylvania, US	Won WBO junior-featherweight title
18	Win	18–0	Cesar Juarez	TKO	5 (12), 2:12	6 Jan 2018	Bukom Boxing Arena, Accra, Ghana	Won vacant WBO interim junior-featherweight title
17	Win	17–0	Javier Chacón	RTD	6 (12), 3:00	22 Jul 2017	Bukom Boxing Arena, Accra, Ghana	Retained WBO International junior-featherweight title
16	Win	16–0	Julián Aristule	TKO	7 (10), 1:15	10 Dec 2016	Spark Arena, Auckland, New Zealand	Won vacant WBO International junior-featherweight title
15	Win	15–0	Neil John Tabanao	UD	12	26 Aug 2016	Police Fitness and Social Centre, Accra, Ghana	Retained WBO Africa featherweight title; Won WBO Oriental and vacant WBC Silver Youth featherweight titles
14	Win	14–0	Edward Kakembo	TKO	6 (10)	18 Jun 2016	Sports Stadium, Accra, Ghana	Retained WBO Africa featherweight title
13	Win	13–0	Michael Pappoe	UD	12	20 Feb 2016	Azumah Nelson Sports Complex, Accra, Ghana	Retained WBO Africa featherweight title
12	Win	12–0	George Krampah	RTD	7 (12), 3:00	26 Dec 2015	Sports Stadium, Accra, Ghana	Won vacant WBO Africa featherweight title
11	Win	11–0	Joseph Adu	TKO	1 (8)	20 Nov 2015	Sports Stadium, Accra, Ghana	
10	Win	10–0	John Oblitey Commey	TKO	3 (12)	6 Nov 2015	Aborigenes Beach Resort, Keta, Ghana	Won vacant West African Boxing Union featherweight title
9	Win	9–0	Aminu Turkson	TKO	6 (8)	24 Oct 2015	Golden Tulip Hotel, Accra, Ghana	
8	Win	8–0	Raymond Ansah	TKO	3	12 Sep 2015	Wembley Park, Accra, Ghana	
7	Win	7–0	Jazzma Hogue	UD	6	11 Apr 2015	Convention Center, Phoenix, Arizona, US	
6	Win	6–0	Jonathan Alcantara	KO	3 (6), 0:59	27 Mar 2015	Quiet Cannon, Montebello, California, US	
5	Win	5–0	Alejandro Ochoa	UD	6	23 Jan 2015	Quiet Cannon, Montebello, California, US	
4	Win	4–0	Wilberth Lopez	UD	6	29 Nov 2014	Westin Bonaventure Hotel, Los Angeles, California, US	
3	Win	3–0	Ronald Rodríguez	TKO	2 (4), 2:24	24 Oct 2014	Crowne Plaza Hotel, San Diego, California, US	
2	Win	2–0	Andy Harris	PTS	4	20 Jun 2014	Waterfront Hall, Belfast, Northern Ireland	
1	Win	1–0	Csaba Toth	KO	3 (6), 0:47	30 Aug 2013	Sternensaal, Bern, Switzerland	

== See also ==
- List of super-bantamweight boxing champions

Sporting positions
Regional boxing titles
Vacant Title last held by Joshua Wahab	West African Boxing Union featherweight champion 6 November 2015 – December 2015	Vacant
Vacant Title last held by Sakaria Lukas	WBO Africa featherweight champion 26 December 2015 – September 2016; Vacated	Vacant Title next held by Sakaria Lukas
Preceded by Neil John Tabanao	WBO Oriental featherweight champion 26 August 2016 – September 2016; Vacated	Vacant Title next held by Luke Jackson
Vacant Title last held by Brayd Smith	WBC Youth Silver featherweight champion 26 August 2016 – September 2016; Vacated	Vacant Title next held by Yiran Li
Vacant Title last held by Bongani Mahlangu	WBO International junior-featherweight champion 10 December 2016 – December 2017; Vacated	Vacant
World boxing titles
New title	WBO junior-featherweight Interim title 6 January 2018 - 28 April 2018; Won full title	Vacant
Preceded by Jessie Magdaleno	WBO junior-featherweight champion 28 April 2018 – 8 December 2018	Succeeded by Emanuel Navarrete
