= Abderrazak Houya =

Tunisian boxer (born 1987)

Personal information
- Nationality: Moroccan-French
- Born: February 20, 1987 (age 39) Monastir, Tunisia
- Height: 1.77 m (5 ft 10 in)
- Weight: Light welterweight

Boxing career
- Stance: Orthodox

Boxing record
- Total fights: 16
- Wins: 14
- Win by KO: 2
- Losses: 2
Medal record
Representing Tunisia
All-Africa Games
Silver medal – second place	2011 Maputo	Light Welterweight
Pan Arab Games
Bronze medal – third place	2011 Doha	Light Welterweight

Abderrazak Houya (born February 20, 1987, in Monastir) is a Tunisian professional boxer who has held the ABU light welterweight title since 2018. As an amateur he represented his country at the 2012 Olympics at junior welterweight.

He placed second at the 2011 All-Africa Games falling to Richarno Colin.

A second place at the 2012 African Boxing Olympic Qualification Tournament was enough to qualify. At the 2012 Summer Olympics he beat H.Hajialiyev (AZE).
