= Magomed Abdulhamidov =

Azerbaijani boxer (born 1986)

Magomed Azizovich Abdulhamidov (Russian: Магомед Азизович Абдулхамидов; Azerbaijani: Məhəmməd Əzizoviç Abdulhəmidov; born 16 November 1986) is an Azerbaijani boxer. At the 2012 Summer Olympics, he competed in the Men's bantamweight, but was defeated in the second round.

Born in Makhachkala, Abdulhamidov was involved in a controversial bout during the 2012 games. He was initially declared the winner in his second fight against Satoshi Shimizu of Japan due to controversial judging and refereeing. At the beginning of the third round, he was leading by 7 points; however, in the last 2 minutes of that round, Abdulhamidov began to tire. Shimizu repeatedly knocked him down, 6 times in total. AIBA officially overturned the ruling after an appeal by the Japanese Coach stating that Abdulhamidov should have been given at least 3 warnings and therefore disqualified. Shimizu went on to take the bronze medal.
