= Boxing at the 2012 Summer Olympics – Men's flyweight =

Boxing competitions

Men's flyweight boxing at the Games of the XXX Olympiad
- Venue: ExCeL Exhibition Centre
- Date: 30 July to 12 August 2012
- Competitors: 26 from 26 nations

Medalists
| 1st place, gold medalist(s) | | Robeisy Ramírez | Cuba |
| 2nd place, silver medalist(s) | | Nyambayaryn Tögstsogt | Mongolia |
| 3rd place, bronze medalist(s) | | Misha Aloyan | Russia |
| 3rd place, bronze medalist(s) | | Michael Conlan | Ireland |

The men's flyweight boxing competition at the 2012 Olympic Games in London was held from 30 July to 12 August at the ExCeL Exhibition Centre. The gold medal was won by Robeisy Ramírez

Twenty-six boxers from 26 nations are competing.

== Competition format ==
Like all Olympic boxing events, the competition was a straight single-elimination tournament. This competition consisted of 26 boxers who had qualified for the competition through various qualifying tournaments held in 2011 and 2012. The competition began with a preliminary round on 30 July, where the number of competitors was reduced to 16, and concluded with a final on 12 August. As there were less than 32 boxers in the competition a number of boxers received a bye for the preliminary round. Both semifinal losers were awarded bronze medals, so no boxers competed again after their first loss.

All bouts consist of three three-minute periods where the boxers receive points for every successful punch they landed on their opponent's head or upper body. The boxer with the most points at the end of the bouts wins. If a boxer is knocked to the ground and cannot get up before the referee counts to 10 then the bout is over and the opponent wins.

== Schedule ==
All times are British Summer Time (UTC+1)

| Date | Time | Round |
|---|---|---|
| Monday 30 July 2012 | 13:30 & 20:30 | Round of 32 |
| Friday 3 August 2012 | 13:30 & 20:30 | Round of 16 |
| Tuesday 7 August 2012 | 20:30 | Quarter-finals |
| Friday 10 August 2012 | 20:30 | Semi-finals |
| Sunday 12 August 2012 | 13:30 | Final |

== Results ==
=== Finals ===
Semi-finals
Misha Aloyan (RUS) | 11
Nyambayaryn Tögstsogt (MGL) | 15
Michael Conlan (IRL) | 10
Robeisy Ramírez (CUB) | 20

Final
Nyambayaryn Tögstsogt (MGL) | 14
Robeisy Ramírez (CUB) | 17

=== Top half ===
Round of 32
Samir Brahimi (ALG) | 14
Jackson Woods (AUS) | 12
Pak Jong-chol (PRK) | 8
Julião Henriques (BRA) | 12
Oteng Oteng (BOT) | 12
Jeyvier Cintrón (PUR) | 14
Hesham Abdelaal (EGY) | 19
Benson Gicharu (KEN) | 16
Elvin Mamishzada (AZE) | 11
Nyambayaryn Tögstsogt (MGL) | 18

Round of 16
Misha Aloyan (RUS) | 14
Samir Brahimi (ALG) | 9
Julião Henriques (BRA) | 13
Jeyvier Cintrón (PUR) | 18
Jasurbek Latipov (UZB) | 21
Hesham Abdelaal (EGY) | 11
Nyambayaryn Tögstsogt (MGL) | 17
Vincenzo Picardi (ITA) | 16

Quarter-finals
Misha Aloyan (RUS) | 23
Jeyvier Cintrón (PUR) | 13
Jasurbek Latipov (UZB) | 10
Nyambayaryn Tögstsogt (MGL) | 15

Semi-finals
Misha Aloyan (RUS) | 11
Nyambayaryn Tögstsogt (MGL) | 15

=== Bottom half ===
Round of 32
Nordine Oubaali (FRA) | 22
Ajmal Faisal (AFG) | 9
Jason Lavigilante (MRI) | 14
Duke Micah (GHA) | 18
Chatchai Butdee (THA) | 24
Selçuk Eker (TUR) | 10
Katsuaki Susa (JPN) | 7
Robeisy Ramírez (CUB) | 19
Ilyas Suleimenov (KAZ) | 13
Salomo Ntuve (SWE) | 8

Round of 16
Rau'shee Warren (USA) | 18
Nordine Oubaali (FRA) | 19
Duke Micah (GHA) | 8
Michael Conlan (IRL) | 19
Chatchai Butdee (THA) | 10
Robeisy Ramírez (CUB) | 22
Ilyas Suleimenov (KAZ) | 15
Andrew Selby (GBR) | 19

Quarter-finals
Nordine Oubaali (FRA) | 18
Michael Conlan (IRL) | 22
Robeisy Ramírez (CUB) | 16
Andrew Selby (GBR) | 11

Semi-finals
Michael Conlan (IRL) | 10
Robeisy Ramírez (CUB) | 20
