= Gilbert Choombe =

Zambian boxer (born 1992)

Gilbert Choombe (born 7 March 1992 in Choma, Zambia) is a Zambian amateur boxer. He competed in the Men's light welterweight event at the 2012 Summer Olympics but lost to Jeff Horn in the first round.

He also competed at the 2010 Youth World Championships, 2011 All-Africa Games, and 2013 World Championships.
