= Satoshi Shimizu =

Japanese boxer

Personal information
- Nickname: Diamond Left
- Nationality: Japanese
- Born: March 13, 1986 (age 40) Sōja, Okayama
- Height: 5 ft 11 in (180 cm)
- Weight: Featherweight; Super-featherweight

Boxing career
- Reach: 71 1/2 in (182 cm)
- Stance: Southpaw

Boxing record
- Total fights: 13
- Wins: 11
- Win by KO: 10
- Losses: 2
Medal record
Men's amateur boxing
Representing Japan
Olympic Games
Bronze medal – third place	2012 London	Bantamweight
Asian Championships
Bronze medal – third place	2009 Zhuhai	Featherweight

Satoshi Shimizu (清水 聡, Shimizu Satoshi; born March 13, 1986 in Okayama) is a Japanese professional boxer who has held the OPBF featherweight title since 2017. As an amateur, he won the bronze medal in the men's bantamweight division at the 2012 Olympics.

== Personal career ==
He is currently an employee of a children's clothing maker, Miki House. He was Second lieutenant in the Japan Ground Self-Defense Force in 2012, and was affiliated with his alma mater, Komazawa University in 2008.

== Amateur boxing career ==
Shimizu started boxing at a gym in Kurashiki, Okayama in the third grade of junior high school.

=== 2008 Summer Olympics ===
He competed at the 2008 Summer Olympics at featherweight (– 57 kg) but lost his first bout 9–12 to Yakup Kılıç. He was not happy about the judgement, and turned down the offers to sign professional contracts in order to win a medal at the Olympics. He secured the bronze medal in the featherweight division in the 2009 Asian Amateur Boxing Championships in Zhuhai, China, and won the National Sports Festival of Japan in the lightweight division to become a three-division champion of that title in the same year.

In January 2010, he had surgery on the shoulder injury that has plagued him for years, and won the regional round of the National Sports Festival all by RSC in the lightweight division. Only one week after that, he moved down in weight class to the bantamweight division because the featherweight division has been removed in the AIBA events for the 2012 Summer Olympics since September 2010, and participated in the Asian Games, but lost in the quarterfinals.

=== 2012 Summer Olympics ===
Shimizu qualified for the 2012 Summer Olympics in the bantamweight division. He beat Isaac Dogboe 10–9, then was initially declared the loser in his second fight by Magomed Abdulhamidov of Azerbaijan due to controversial judging and refereeing. At the beginning of the third round, he was trailing Abdulhamidov by 7 points; however, in the last 2 minutes of that round, Abdulhamidov began to tire. Shimizu repeatedly knocked his opponent down, 6 times in total. (Note: Boxing Men's Bantam (56kg) Round of 16 Replay - London 2012 Olympic Games (YouTube video). IOC. August 1, 2012. Event occurs at 51:44.) AIBA officially overturned the ruling after an appeal by the Japanese Coach stating that Abdulhamidov should have been given at least 3 warnings and therefore disqualified.

Shimizu defeated Algeria's Mohamed Ouadahi 17–15 in the quarter-finals but lost to Great Britain's Luke Campbell 20–11 in the semi-finals which won him the bronze medal. It was Japan's first men's boxing medal since 1968. Shimizu made a significant contribution to Japan's 2012 Olympic boxing team as an icebreaker. However, the medal was lost in spring 2013.

He decided to join APB (AIBA Pro Boxing) for the right to fight for the gold at the 2016 Summer Olympics. So, he retired from the Japan Ground Self-Defense Force, and entered Miki House in April 2014.

== Professional boxing career ==
=== Early career ===
Shimizu decided to turn professional after failing to qualify for the 2016 Summer Olympics. He began training at the Ohashi Boxing Gym, and acquired his professional boxing license on July 29, 2016.

Shimizu made his professional debut against In Kyoo Lee on September 4, 2016, on the undercard of the WBO super-flyweight title bout between Naoya Inoue and Petchbarngborn Kokietgym. He won the fight by a fifth-round knockout, flooring Lee with a left hook to the body, which prompted his corner-men to throw in the towel. Prior to the knockout, Lee was knocked down in both the second and fourth rounds.

Shimizu faced the 6–3 Carlo Demecillo in his second professional appearance, which took place on the undercard of the December 30, 2016, WBO super-flyweight title bout between Naoya Inoue and Kohei Kono. He won the fight by a third-round knockout, stopping Demecillo with a right hook to the jaw. Shimizu was next scheduled to face Takuya Yamamoto on May 21, 2017. He won the fight by a first-round technical knockout.

=== OPBF featherweight champion ===
Shimizu was booked to challenge the reigning OPBF featherweight champion Sa Myung Noh on October 2, 2017. The title fight was scheduled as the main event of the "61st Phoenix Battle", which took place at the Korakuen Hall in Tokyo, Japan. He captured the belt with a fifth-round knockout of Noh. Shimizu pressured Noh from the outset of the fight and knocked him down it the fourth. Although he was unable to finish him in that round, he managed to do so at the 1:54 minute mark of the very next round. Shimizu made his first title defense against Eduardo Mancito on December 30, 2017, on the undercard of the Naoya Inoue and Yoan Boyeaux WBO super-flyweight title bout. He knocked Mancito down with a right hook in the first round and dropped him twice more in the seventh round, before finally finishing the Filipino challenger with a right hook at the 2:08 minute mark of the seventh round.

Shimizu made his second title defense against Kyung Min Kwon on March 26, 2018, in his return to the Korakuen Hall in Tokyo, Japan, where he first won the belt. He first knocked Kwon down with a left straight in the sixth round, before forcing the referee to wave the fight off with a flurry of punches in the eight round. Shimizu made his third title defense against the 16–3–1 Shingo Kawamura on August 17, 2018. He won the fight by a fourth-round knockout. Shimizu first staggered Kawamura with a left straight, before knockoing him out with a strike to the body. Shimizu made his third title defense against the undefeated Takuya Uehara on December 3, 2018, in the main event of "66th Phoenix Battle". He won the fight by a third-round technical knockout.

Shimizu was booked to challenge the reigning WBO Asia Pacific super-featherweight champion Joe Noynay on July 12, 2019, on the Rob Brant vs Ryota Murata II undercard, at the Edion Arena in Osaka, Japan. Despite coming into the fight as a favorite, Shimizu suffered an upset stoppage loss. Shimizu was knocked down twice in the first round and failed to recover in the remaining five rounds, as he lost the fight by a sixth-round technical knockout.

Shimizu made his fifth OPBF featherweight title defense against Kyohei Tonomoto on July 16, 2020, after a year-long absence from the sport. He won the fight by a seventh-round technical knockout. Shimizu was booked to face the WBO Asia Pacific featherweight champion Musashi Mori in his sixth title defense on May 21, 2021. He won the fight by unanimous decision. Two of the judges scored the fight 118–110 in his favor, while the third judge scored the fight 116–112 for Shimizu. Shimizu vacated the WBO Asia Pacific title on November 26, 2021, six months after he had won it.

== Professional boxing record ==
14 fights	11 wins	2 losses
By knockout	10	2
By decision	1	0
Draws	1	

No.	Result	Record	Opponent	Type	Round, time	Date	Location	Notes
14	Draw	11–2–1	Reiya Abe	MD	10	25 Mar 2025	Korakuen Hall, Tokyo, Japan	
13	Loss	11–2	Robeisy Ramírez	TKO	5 (12) 1:08	25 Jul 2023	Ariake Arena, Tokyo, Japan	For WBO featherweight title
12	Win	11–1	Landy Cris Leon	RTD	2 (8), 3:00	13 Dec 2022	Ariake Arena, Tokyo, Japan	
11	Win	10–1	Musashi Mori	UD	12	21 May 2021	Korakuen Hall, Tokyo, Japan	Retained OPBF featherweight title; Won WBO Asia Pacific featherweight title
10	Win	9–1	Kyohei Tonomoto	TKO	7 (12), 2:10	16 Jul 2020	Korakuen Hall, Tokyo, Japan	Retained OPBF featherweight title
9	Loss	8–1	Joe Noynay	TKO	6 (12), 2:18	12 Jul 2019	Edion Arena, Osaka, Japan	For WBO Asia Pacific super-featherweight title
8	Win	8–0	Takuya Uehara	TKO	3 (12), 1:26	3 Dec 2018	Korakuen Hall, Tokyo, Japan	Retained OPBF featherweight title
7	Win	7–0	Shingo Kawamura	TKO	4 (12), 2:43	17 Aug 2018	Korakuen Hall, Tokyo, Japan	Retained OPBF featherweight title
6	Win	6–0	Kyung Min Kwon	TKO	8 (12), 1:06	26 Mar 2018	Korakuen Hall, Tokyo, Japan	Retained OPBF featherweight title
5	Win	5–0	Eduardo Mancito	TKO	7 (12), 2:08	30 Dec 2017	Cultural Gymnasium, Yokohama, Japan	Retained OPBF featherweight title
4	Win	4–0	Sa Myung Noh	TKO	5 (12), 1:54	2 Oct 2017	Korakuen Hall, Tokyo, Japan	Won OPBF featherweight title
3	Win	3–0	Takuya Yamamoto	TKO	1 (8), 1:49	21 May 2017	Ariake Coliseum, Tokyo, Japan	
2	Win	2–0	Carlo Demecillo	KO	3 (8), 1:09	30 Dec 2016	Ariake Coliseum, Tokyo, Japan	
1	Win	1–0	In Kyoo Lee	KO	5 (6), 2:13	4 Sep 2016	Sky Arena, Zama, Japan	

== See also ==
- List of Olympic medalists in boxing
- List of 2012 Summer Olympics medal winners
- 2012 Asian Boxing Olympic Qualification Tournament
- Controversies at the 2012 Summer Olympics
- Chronological summary of the 2012 Summer Olympics

Sporting positions
Regional boxing titles
Preceded by Sa Myung Noh	OPBF featherweight champion 2 October 2017 – present	Incumbent
