= Reine Sosso =

Cameroonian footballer

Personal information
- Date of birth: 19 March 1993 (age 33)
- Place of birth: Cameroon
- Position: Goalkeeper

Senior career*
Years	Team	Apps	(Gls)
2012	Franck Rollycek		

International career
2012	Cameroon	11 (?)	(0)
- * Club domestic league appearances and goals

Reine Sosso (born 19 March 1993) was a female Cameroonian football goalkeeper.

She was part of the Cameroon women's national football team at the 2012 Summer Olympics. On club level she played for Franck Rollycek.

== See also ==
- Cameroon at the 2012 Summer Olympics
