= Abdelmalek Rahou =

Algerian boxer

Abdelmalek Rahou (b. March 17, 1986 - Algier) is an Algerian boxer who competed at the 2012 Olympics at Middleweight.

At the Olympic qualifier (results) he won two bouts and qualified in spite of being edged out by Mujandjae Kasuto. In London 2012 (results) he beat the Australian Jesse Ross then lost to eventual champion Ryōta Murata 12:21.
