= Romeo Lemboumba =

Gabonese boxer (born 1980)

Personal information
- Born: May 19, 1980 (age 44)
- Height: 1.65 m (5 ft 5 in)

Sport
- Country: Gabon
- Sport: Boxing
- Event: Bantamweight
- Updated on 29 July 2012

Romeo Braexir Lemboumba (19 May 1980) is a boxer who represented Gabon at the 2012 Summer Olympics. He did this, in part, by defeating Olympic bronze medalist Bruno Julie at the 2012 African Boxing Olympic Qualification Tournament.

Lemboumba was defeated in the first round by Dominican William Encarnación in the Men's bantamweight event at the 2012 Olympics.
