= Samir Brahimi =

Algerian boxer (born 1990)

Personal information
- Nationality: Algeria
- Born: May 17, 1990 (age 36)

Sport
- Sport: Boxing
- Event: Flyweight
Medal record
Men's Boxing
Representing Algeria
All-Africa Games
Silver medal – second place	2011 Maputo	Flyweight

Samir Brahimi is an Algerian boxer born on 17 May 1990 in Algiers. His amateur career was marked by a bronze medal at the African Championships of Vacoas in 2009 and another in Yaounde in 2011, and a silver medal at the All Africa Games in Maputo in 2011, flyweight category.

At the 2012 Olympics he beat Australian Jackson Woods but lost to Russian Misha Aloyan.
