= Lukman Lawal =

Nigerian boxer (born 1988)

Personal information
- Nationality: Nigerian
- Born: 19 November 1988 (age 37) Lagos, Nigeria
- Weight: 81 kg (179 lb)

Sport
- Sport: Boxing

Achievements and titles
- Highest world ranking: IOC Ambassador for Tokyo Olympics 2020
Medal record
Men's Boxing
Representing Nigeria
All-Africa Games
Silver medal – second place	2011 Maputo	Light heavyweight

Lukman Lawal (born 19 November 1988) is a Nigerian boxer. At the 2012 Summer Olympics, he competed in the Men's light heavyweight, but was defeated in the first round. He competed in the same division at the 2014 Commonwealth Games.
