= Kamel Rahmani =

Algerian boxer (born 1979)

Personal information
- Nationality: Algerian
- Born: 20 February 1979 (age 47) Algiers, Algeria
- Weight: Super Heavyweight

Boxing career
Medal record
Men's amateur boxing
Representing Algeria
African Games
Gold medal – first place	2011 Maputo	Super Heavyweight
Pan Arab Games
Bronze medal – third place	2011 Doha	Super Heavyweight

Kamel Rahmani (born 20 February 1979) is an Algerian boxer. He won a gold medal in the men's super heavyweight event at the 2011 All-Africa Games. After the continental championships, he didn't compete at the World Championships because he had a muscle injury.

== Career ==
=== World Series of Boxing record ===
2 fights	0 wins	2 losses
By knockout	0	1
By decision	0	1

No.	Result	Record	Team	Opponent (Team)	Type	Round, time	Date	Location	Notes
2	Loss	0–2	Algeria Desert Hawks	Iegor Plevako (Ukraine Otamans)	TKO 3	5	11 Jan 2014	Tipaza, Algeria	
1	Loss	0–1	Algeria Desert Hawks	(Belarus) Yan Sudzilouski (Hussars of Poland)	PTS	5	24 Feb 2013	Blida, Algeria	WSB debut
