= Blaise Yepmou =

Cameroonian boxer (born 1985)

Medal record

Representing Cameroon

Men's Boxing

Commonwealth Games
Bronze medal – third place	2010 Delhi	Super-heavyweight

Blaise Yepmou Mendouo (born 2 January 1985 in Douala) is a Cameroonian-French boxer. He competed in the super heavyweight event at the 2012 Summer Olympics and was eliminated in the round of 16 by Mohamed Arjaoui of Morocco. After his defeat, he was one of seven Cameroonian athletes who disappeared from the Olympic Village. Yepmou, along with the five other boxers who absconded (Thomas Essomba, Abdon Mewoli, Christian Donfack, and Serge Ambomo), applied for asylum to stay in the UK, citing threats from the Cameroon officials as a contributing factor; although the head of the Cameroon delegation to the Olympics denied the allegations.

== Professional boxing record ==
13 fights	4 wins	9 losses
By knockout	1	2
By decision	3	7

No.	Result	Record	Opponent	Type	Round, time	Date	Location
13	Loss	4–9	Simon Vallily	TKO	4 (4), 2:24	17 Feb 2018	Manchester Arena, Manchester, England
12	Loss	4–8	Tommy McCarthy	PTS	6	18 Nov 2017	SSE Arena, Belfast, Northern Ireland
11	Loss	4–7	Jack Massey	PTS	8	21 Oct 2017	First Direct Arena, Leeds, England
10	Win	4–6	Josh Quailey	TKO	3 (4), 0:46	13 Oct 2017	Rollerworld, Derby, England
9	Loss	3–6	Lee Carter	PTS	4	23 Sep 2017	Manchester Arena, Manchester, England
8	Loss	3–5	Sean Turner	PTS	6	16 Sep 2017	Devenish Complex, Belfast, Northern Ireland
7	Loss	3–4	Lawrence Okolie	PTS	6	1 Sep 2017	York Hall, London, England
6	Loss	3–3	Simon Vallily	PTS	6	23 Jun 2017	Walker Activity Dome, Newcastle, England
5	Loss	3–2	Daniel Dubois	TKO	2 (4), 0:48	22 Apr 2017	Leicester Arena, Leicester, England
4	Loss	3–1	Sam Hyde	PTS	6	22 Oct 2016	Bowlers Exhibition Centre, Manchester, England
3	Win	3–0	Shane Dragonslayer	PTS	4	31 Oct 2015	Castle Leisure Centre, Bury, England
2	Win	2–0	Moses Matovu	PTS	4	31 Jul 2015	Middleton Arena, Middleton, England
1	Win	1–0	Istvan Orsos	PTS	4	30 May 2015	Middleton Arena, Middleton, England
