= Seleman Kidunda =

Tanzanian boxer (born 1984)

Seleman Salum Kidunda (also spelled Selemani) (born 2 January 1984 in Ruvuma) is a Tanzanian boxer. He competed in the 2010 Commonwealth Games. Kidunda also competed in the Men's welterweight event at the 2012 Summer Olympics but lost to Moldovan Vasile Belous in the first round. The loss was blamed on several referee mistakes. At the 2014 Commonwealth Games, where he was the Tanzanian flag-bearer, he lost in the first round to Kehinde Ademuyiwa. He took up the sport of boxing after seeing Mike Tyson box on television and was named Tanzanian Boxer of the Year by the Tanzania Sports Writers Association.
