= Christian Donfack =

Cameroonian boxer (born 1983)

Christian Donfack Adjoufack (born 20 November 1983 in Yaoundé) is a Cameroonian boxer. He competed in the light heavyweight event at the 2012 Summer Olympics and was eliminated in the round of 32 by Enrico Kölling. After his defeat, he was one of seven Cameroonian athletes who disappeared from the 2012 London Olympic Village. Donfack, along with the five other boxers who absconded (Thomas Essomba, Abdon Mewoli, Blaise Yepmou Mendouo, and Serge Ambomo), applied for asylum to stay in the UK, citing threats from the Cameroon officials as a contributing factor; although the head of the Cameroon delegation to the Olympics denied the allegations.
