= Ahmed Barki =

Moroccan boxer

Ahmed Barki (born 16 March 1980 in Hay Hassani) is a Moroccan boxer. At the 2012 Summer Olympics, he competed in the Men's light heavyweight, but was defeated in the first round.
