= Duke Micah =

Ghanaian boxer

Personal information
- Nickname: Baby-faced Terminator
- Nationality: Ghanaian
- Born: 26 September 1991 (age 35) Accra, Ghana
- Weight: Bantamweight

Boxing career
- Stance: Orthodox

Boxing record
- Total fights: 27
- Wins: 24
- Win by KO: 19
- Losses: 3

Duke Akueteh Micah (born 16 September 1991) is a Ghanaian professional boxer who challenged for the WBO bantamweight title in September 2020. At regional level, he held multiple bantamweight titles, including the Commonwealth title in 2016. As an amateur he represented Ghana at the 2012 Summer Olympics.

== Amateur career ==
As an amateur, he competed in the Men's flyweight division at the 2012 Olympics. He won his first bout against Jason Lavigilante of Mauritius by 18 points to 14. In the second round, he was defeated by Michael Conlan of Ireland, losing by 19 points to 8.

== Professional career ==
He held the WBO Africa bantamweight title which he acquired in his twelfth bout, knocking out Ekow Wilson, also of Ghana, in the third round. Micah defended this title twice, first in a re-match with Wilson and then against Yaqub Kareem of Nigeria, both wins coming by way of knockout.

=== Micah vs. Casimero ===
In 2020, he fought for the WBO bantamweight title and lost via third-round knockout to Johnriel Casimero. The fight was stopped by the referee with 54 seconds left in the third round.

== Professional boxing record ==
27 fights	24 wins	3 losses
By knockout	19	3
By decision	5	0

No.	Result	Record	Opponent	Type	Round, time	Date	Location	Notes
27	Loss	24–3	Dominique Crowder	TKO	1 (8), 1:27	16 Nov 2024	Tropicana Hotel & Casino, Atlantic City, US	
26	Loss	24–2	Carlos Gonzalez	TKO	8 (10), 2:51	14 Sep 2024	Mass Mutual Center, Springfield, US	For vacant North American Boxing Association Featherweight title
25	Loss	24–1	John Riel Casimero	TKO	3 (12), 0:54	26 Sep 2020	Mohegan Sun Arena, Uncasville, Connecticut, US	For WBO bantamweight title
24	Win	24–0	Janiel Rivera	UD	8	7 Dec 2019	Barclays Center, New York City, New York, US	
23	Win	23–0	Luis Roy Suarez Cruz	TKO	2 (10), 1:42	31 Aug 2019	Minneapolis Armory, Minneapolis, Minnesota, US	
22	Win	22–0	Thomas Snow	SD	10	9 Jun 2018	Kings Theatre, New York City, New York, US	Retained WBC International bantamweight title
21	Win	21–0	Jose Santos Gonzalez	MD	10	18 Nov 2017	Resorts World, New York City, New York, US	Retained WBC International bantamweight title
20	Win	20–0	Jonathan Aguilar	RTD	8 (12), 3:00	11 Mar 2017	Bukom Boxing Arena, Accra, Ghana	Won vacant WBC International bantamweight title
19	Win	19–0	Matthew Chanda	SD	12	12 Nov 2016	York Hall, London, England	Won vacant Commonwealth bantamweight title
18	Win	18–0	Yaqub Kareem	TKO	9 (12)	6 Aug 2016	Accra Sports Stadium, Accra, Ghana	Retained WBO Africa bantamweight title
17	Win	17–0	Mikheil Soloninkini	TKO	4 (6), 2:05	14 May 2016	York Hall, London, England	
16	Win	16–0	Reynaldo Cajina	KO	4 (6), 0:32	16 Apr 2016	Chilwell Olympia, Chilwell, England	
15	Win	15–0	Ekow Wilson	TKO	8 (12)	26 Dec 2015	Accra Sports Stadium, Accra, Ghana	Retained WBO Africa bantamweight title
14	Win	14–0	Joseph Adu	UD	8	30 Apr 2015	Cuzzy Bro's, Accra, Ghana	
13	Win	13–0	John Oblitey Commey	TKO	5 (8), 0:35	14 Mar 2015	City Engineers Yard, Accra, Ghana	
12	Win	12–0	Ekow Wilson	KO	3 (12)	28 Mar 2014	Art Centre, Accra, Ghana	Won vacant WBO Africa bantamweight title
11	Win	11–0	Billy Quaye	TKO	2 (8), 1:30	8 Jun 2013	Will Power Boxing Complex, Accra, Ghana	
10	Win	10–0	John Oblitey Commey	TKO	3 (10), 2:42	22 Mar 2013	Accra Sports Stadium, Accra, Ghana	
9	Win	9–0	Kofi Boateng	TKO	6 (8), 2:34	2 Mar 2013	City Engineers Yard, Accra, Ghana	
8	Win	8–0	Kofi Atanga	TKO	6 (8), 1:27	16 Feb 2013	Will Power Boxing Complex, Accra, Ghana	
7	Win	7–0	Issah Suleman	TKO	2 (8), 2:53	2 Feb 2013	Will Power Boxing Complex, Accra, Ghana	
6	Win	6–0	Solomon Oku	KO	2 (8), 1:42	12 Jan 2013	Will Power Boxing Complex, Accra, Ghana	
5	Win	5–0	Raymond Ansah	TKO	4 (8), 2:21	12 Dec 2012	Will Power Boxing Complex, Accra, Ghana	
4	Win	4–0	Felix Uzukwu	TKO	5 (6), 1:42	30 Nov 2012	Will Power Boxing Complex, Accra, Ghana	
3	Win	3–0	Mohammed Baba	KO	1 (6), 1:19	16 Nov 2012	Will Power Boxing Complex, Accra, Ghana	
2	Win	2–0	JJ Arku	KO	2 (6), 1:08	9 Nov 2012	Will Power Boxing Complex, Accra, Ghana	
1	Win	1–0	Michael Doe	KO	4 (6), 2:33	2 Nov 2012	Will Power Boxing Complex, Accra, Ghana	

== See also ==
- Ghana at the 2012 Summer Olympics
