= Jonas Matheus =

Namibian boxer (born 1986)

Jonas Matheus (born 29 July 1986) is a Namibian boxer. He began boxing in 2010 and competed at the 2012 Summer Olympics as a bantamweight boxer, where he was defeated by Italian Vittorio Parrinello.
