= Aboubakr Lbida =

Moroccan boxer (born 1980)

Aboubakr Seddik Lbida (born 26 January 1980 in Hay Hassani) is a Moroccan boxer. At the 2012 Summer Olympics, he competed in the Men's bantamweight, but was defeated in the first round by Ibrahim Balla of Australia.
