= Mehdi Khalsi =

Moroccan boxer

Mehdi Khalsi (born June 6, 1986, in Casablanca) is a Moroccan amateur boxer who competed at the 2008 and 2012 Olympics at welterweight (69 kg).

At the 2008 Summer Olympics he lost in his debut to Dilshod Mahmudov 3–11.

At the 2012 African Boxing Olympic Qualification Tournament he qualified again at the same weightclass. At the 2012 Summer Olympics (results) he again lost in his first fight to Yasuhiro Suzuki, 13:14.
