= Muideen Akanji =

Nigerian boxer (born 1992)

Personal information
- Nationality: Nigeria
- Born: 12 May 1992 (age 34) Lagos, Nigeria

Sport
- Sport: Boxing
- Event: Middleweight
Medal record
Men's Boxing
Representing Nigeria
All-Africa Games
Bronze medal – third place	2011 Maputo	Heavyweight

Muideen Akanji (born May 12, 1992) is a Nigerian boxer who competes as a middleweight. At the 2012 Summer Olympics he was defeated in the heats of the Men's middleweight by Darren O'Neill.
