= Ayabonga Sonjica =

South African boxer (born 1991)

Personal information
- Born: 27 June 1991 (age 34) East London, Eastern Cape, South Africa
Medal record
Men's Boxing
Representing South Africa
All-Africa Games
Bronze medal – third place	2011 Maputo	Bantamweight

Ayabonga Sonjica (born 27 June 1991 in East London, Eastern Cape) is a South African boxer. At the 2012 Summer Olympics, he competed in the Men's bantamweight, but was defeated in the first round by Detelin Dalakliev of Bulgaria. He competed at the 2014 Commonwealth Games, where he reached the quarterfinals, losing to Sean McGoldrick.

== Professional boxing record ==
9 fights	9 wins	0 losses
By knockout	7	0
By decision	2	0

No.	Result	Record	Opponent	Type	Round, time	Date	Location	Notes
9	Win	9–0	(South Africa) Innocent Mantengu	UD	12	29 Sep 2019	Orient Theatre, East London, South Africa	Won South African super bantamweight title
8	Win	8–0	(South Africa) Asiphe Ntshili	TKO	8 (10), 2:20	7 Apr 2019	Nangoza Jebe Hall, Port Elizabeth, South Africa	
7	Win	7–0	(South Africa) Luthando Mbumbulwana	TKO	5 (6)	9 Dec 2018	Orient Theatre, East London, South Africa	
6	Win	6–0	(South Africa) Nasiphe Mdlangaza	TKO	3 (6)	21 Oct 2018	Time Square Casino, Pretoria, South Africa	
5	Win	5–0	(South Africa) Deon Mbumbana	TKO	1 (4)	10 Aug 2018	Emperors Palace, Kempton Park, South Africa	
4	Win	4–0	(South Africa) Tumelo Matsane	TKO	1 (4), 1:50	23 Jun 2018	Emperors Palace, Kempton Park, South Africa	
3	Win	3–0	(South Africa) Lihle Gingxana	TKO	3 (4)	10 Dec 2017	Orient Theatre, East London, South Africa	
2	Win	2–0	(South Africa) Alex Matlaila	PTS	4	23 Jul 2017	Emperors Palace, Kempton Park, South Africa	
1	Win	1–0	(South Africa) July Masuku	TKO	2 (4)	23 Apr 2017	Emperors Palace, Kempton Park, South Africa	
