= Boxing at the 2011 All-Africa Games =

Boxing competitions

Boxing at the 2011 All-Africa Games in Maputo, Mozambique was held between September 4–11, 2011.

== Medal winners ==
Event	Gold	Silver	Bronze
Light Flyweight (– 48 kilograms)	Thomas Essomba (CMR)	Mohamed Flissi (ALG)	Ronald Serugo (UGA); Kibron Tewelde (ETH)
Flyweight (– 52 kilograms)	Oteng Oteng (BOT)	Samir Brahimi (ALG)	Moroke Mokhotho (LES); Climádio Guifutela (MOZ)
Bantamweight (– 56 kilograms)	Bruno Julie (MRI)	Reda Benbaziz (ALG)	Ayabonga Sonjica (RSA); António Malie (MOZ)
Lightweight (– 60 kilograms)	Ahmed Mejri (TUN)	Mmoloki Nogeng (BOT)	Jean Richard Colin (MRI); Abdon Mewoli (CMR)
Light Welterweight (– 64 kilograms)	Richarno Colin (MRI)	Abderrazak Houya (TUN)	Gomotsang Gaasite (BOT); Thulani Mbenge (RSA)
Welterweight (– 69 kilograms)	Joseph Mulema (CMR)	Kehnde Ademuyima (NGA)	Rayton Okwiri (KEN); Siphiwe Lusizi (RSA)
Middleweight (– 75 kilograms)	Kennedy St-Pierre (MRI)	Saad Kaddous (ALG)	Mujamadjae Kasuto (CMR); Daniel Shishia (KEN)
Light Heavyweight (– 81 kilograms)	Abdelhafid Benchabla (ALG)	Lukman Lawal (NGA)	David Akankolim (GHA); Christian Donfack (CMR)
Heavyweight (– 91 kilograms)	Chouaib Bouloudinat (ALG)	Efetobor Apochi (NGR)	Romarik Ngoula (CMR); Muideen Akanji (NGA)
Super Heavyweight (+ 91 kilograms)	Kamel Rahmani (ALG)	Aymen Trabelsi (TUN)	Tshisekedi Mbiya (COD); Paolo Schaffer (RSA)

== Medal table ==
Rank	Nation	Gold	Silver	Bronze	Total
1	Algeria (ALG)	3	4	0	7
2	Mauritius (MRI)	3	0	1	4
3	Cameroon (CMR)	2	0	4	6
4	Tunisia (TUN)	1	2	0	3
5	Botswana (BOT)	1	1	1	3
6	Nigeria (NGA)	0	3	1	4
7	South Africa (RSA)	0	0	4	4
8	Ghana (GHA)	0	0	2	2
8	Mozambique (MOZ)	0	0	2	2
10	DR Congo (COD)	0	0	1	1
10	Ethiopia (ETH)	0	0	1	1
10	Kenya (KEN)	0	0	1	1
10	Lesotho (LES)	0	0	1	1
10	Uganda (UGA)	0	0	1	1
Totals (14 entries)		10	10	20	40
