= Shafiq Chitou =

Beninese boxer (born 1985)

Personal information
- Nationality: Beninese
- Born: May 23, 1985 (age 41) Cotonou
- Height: 1.68 m (5 ft 6 in)

Sport
- Country: Benin
- Sport: Boxing
- Event: Lightweight
- Updated on 5 August 2012

Shafiq Chitou (born 23 May 1985) is a Beninese boxer. He qualified to compete in boxing at the 2012 Summer Olympics, but funding woes were a concern for him. He currently works as a house painter. Chitou lost to Félix Verdejo of Puerto Rico in the first round of the Men's lightweight event at the 2012 Summer Olympics.
