= Maxwell Amponsah =

Ghanaian boxer

Personal information
- Nationality: Ghanaian
- Born: 9 October 1986 (age 39) Accra, Ghana
- Height: 1.88 m (6 ft 2 in)
- Weight: Light heavyweight

Boxing career
- Stance: Orthodox

Boxing record
- Total fights: 14
- Wins: 11
- Win by KO: 10
- Losses: 3

Maxwell Amponsah (born 9 October 1986) is a Ghanaian professional boxer. As an amateur, he competed at the 2012 Summer Olympics in the heavyweight event.

Amponsah was the flag bearer of Ghana at the opening ceremony. However, he had to withdraw from the Olympic competition due to an unhealed broken jaw.

== Professional boxing record ==
14 fights	11 wins	3 losses
By knockout	10	3
By decision	1	0

No.	Result	Record	Opponent	Type	Round, time	Date	Location	Notes
14	Loss	11–3	Yunieski Gonzalez	TKO	1 (10), 2:02	11 Nov 2016	Miami Airport Convention Center, Miami, Florida, U.S.	
13	Loss	11–2	Shawndell Winters	KO	5 (6), 2:25	30 Jul 2016	Horseshoe Casino, Hammond, Indiana, U.S.	
12	Win	11–1	Stephen Abbey	TKO	3 (8)	26 Dec 2015	Accra Sports Stadium, Accra, Ghana	
11	Win	10–1	Eric Kwardey	TKO	4 (8), 1:09	14 Mar 2015	City Engineers Yard, Accra, Ghana	
10	Win	9–1	Francis Manda	TKO	5 (10), 1:21	27 Feb 2015	Lebanon House, Accra, Ghana	
9	Loss	8–1	Ebenezer Tetteh	TKO	1 (12), 1:32	5 Dec 2014	Accra Sports Stadium, Accra, Ghana	
8	Win	8–0	Boniface Kabore	TKO	2 (8)	5 Sep 2014	Le palais des sports de Ouaga 2008, Ouagadougou, Burkina Faso	
7	Win	7–0	George Bamson	TKO	4 (12), 2:57	15 May 2014	Accra Sports Stadium, Accra, Ghana	For vacant Ghanaian light heavyweight title; Title only at stake for Bamson as Amponsah misses weight
6	Win	6–0	Kwesi Tutu	TKO	5 (8), 1:39	4 Apr 2014	City Engineers Yard, Accra, Ghana	
5	Win	5–0	Aduku Nsor	KO	1 (8), 0:45	28 Mar 2014	Art Centre, Accra, Ghana	
4	Win	4–0	Selynanus Allotey	KO	4 (6), 1:52	23 Feb 2014	City Engineers Yard, Accra, Ghana	
3	Win	3–0	Jones Quarshie	TKO	2 (8), 1:09	14 Feb 2014	Seconds Out Boxing Gymnasium, Accra, Ghana	
2	Win	2–0	Daddy Mpinga	KO	1 (4)	29 Aug 2013	Gold Reef Entertainment Centre, Johannesburg, South Africa	
1	Win	1–0	Gabriel Davhana	PTS	4	30 May 2013	Presleys Restaurant, Boksburg, South Africa	

Olympic Games
Preceded by Kwame Nkrumah-Acheampong	Flagbearer for Ghana; 2012 London	Succeeded by Flings Owusu-Agyapong
