= Oliver Lavigilante =

Mauritian boxer

Jason Oliver Lavigilante is a Mauritian boxer. At the 2012 Summer Olympics, he competed in the Men's flyweight, but was defeated in the first round by Duke Micah.
