= Hay Hassani =

Hay Hassani الحي الحسني
- District and arrondissement of Casablanca
- Interactive map of Hay Hassani
- Coordinates: 33°34′25″N 7°40′34″W
- Country: Morocco
- Region: Casablanca-Settat

Area
  - Total: 25.91 km^{2} (10.00 sq mi)

Population (2024)
  - Total: 537,509
- Time zone: UTC+0 (WET)
  - Summer (DST): UTC+1 (WEST)

Hay Hassani (Arabic: الحي الحسني) is a district, arrondissement and suburb of southwestern Casablanca, in the Casablanca-Settat region of Morocco. The district covers an area of 25.91 square kilometres (10 square miles) and as of the 2024 Moroccan census had 537,509 inhabitants. The district contains one arrondissement of the same name.
