= Richarno Colin =

Mauritian boxer (born 1987)

Personal information
- Born: July 17, 1987 (age 39) Vacoas, Mauritius
Medal record
Men's Boxing
Representing Mauritius
Commonwealth Games
Silver medal – second place	2022 Birmingham	Light welterweight
Bronze medal – third place	2010 Delhi	Light welterweight
African Championships
Bronze medal – third place	2015 Casablanca	Light welterweight
All-Africa Games
Gold medal – first place	2011 Maputo	Light welterweight

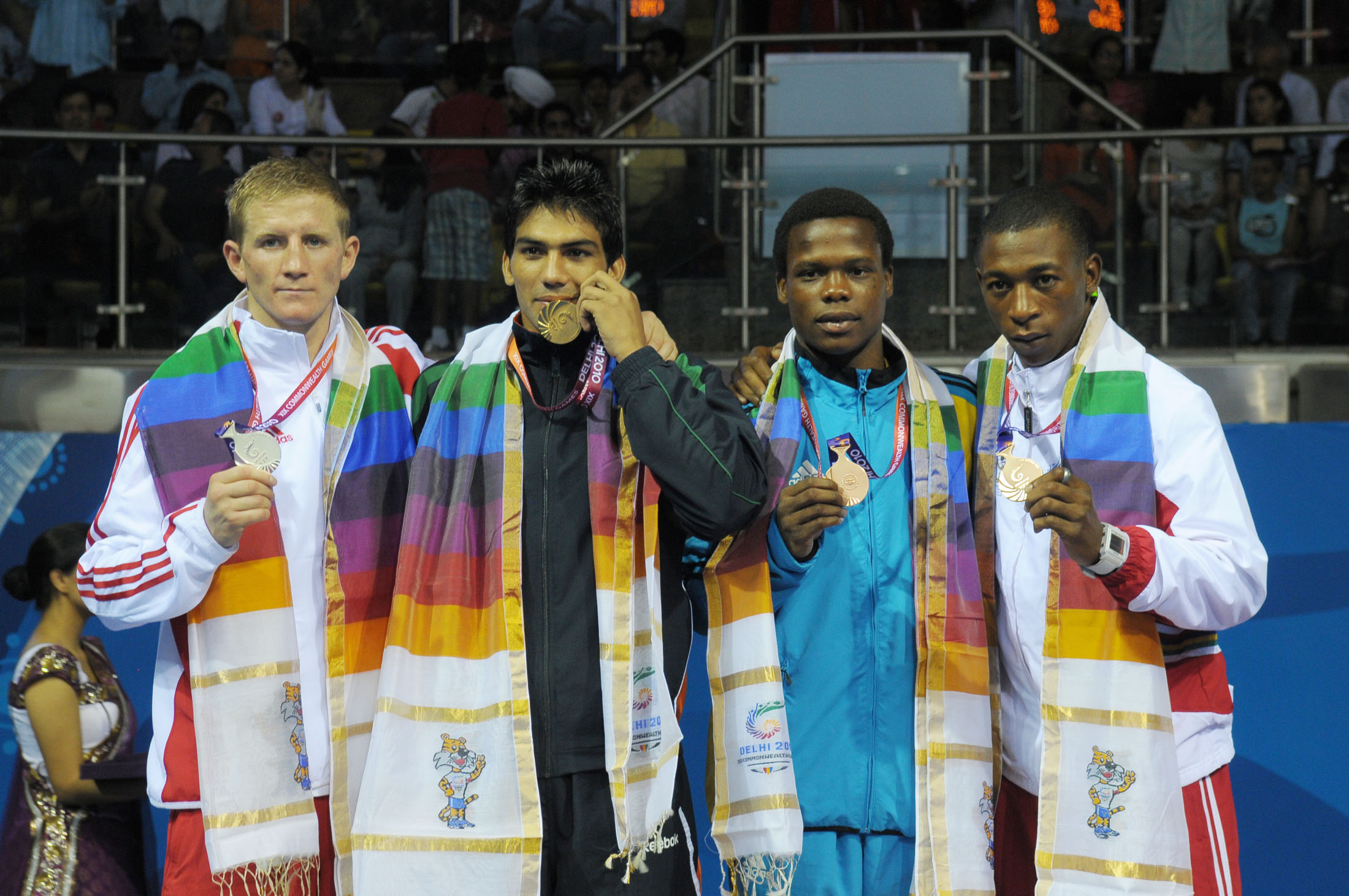
XIX Commonwealth Games-2010 Delhi Winners of Light Welter Weight (64 kg) Boxing Event: Richarno Colin (Bronze), last on right

Louis Richarno Colin (born 17 July 1987 in Vacoas-Phoenix, Mauritius) is a Mauritian boxer best known to be All Africa champ 2011.

He qualified for the 2008 Olympics at junior welterweight at the 2nd AIBA African 2008 Olympic Qualifying Tournament. At Beijing he upset Myke Carvalho but was defeated by Gennady Kovalev from Russia in the round of 16.(Results)

He has competed in the 2010 Commonwealth Games under the name of Louis Colin. In the opening ceremony, he was the flag carrier for Mauritius. He won bronze in the Light Welterweight category in Boxing.

At the 2012 African Boxing Olympic Qualification Tournament, he also qualified for the 2012 London Olympics. At London, he beat Abdelhak Aatakni in the first round before losing to Uranchimegiin Mönkh-Erdene in the second round.

At the 2020 Summer Olympics, he competed in the men's lightweight event.

== Commonwealth results ==
2010 (as Light Welterweight) (as Louis Colin)

- Defeated Chris Jenkins (Wales) 7–0
- Defeated Luke Woods (Australia) 8–3
- Defeated Philip Bowes (Jamaica) 6–0
- Lost to Bradley Saunders (England) 7–10

Olympic Games
Preceded by Kate Foo Kune	Flag bearer for Mauritius; Tokyo 2020 with Roilya Ranaivosoa	Succeeded by Aurelie Halbwachs; Jean Gaël Laurent L'Entete
