= Abdelali Daraa =

Moroccan boxer (born 1990)

Abdelali Daraa (born 25 April 1990 in Casablanca, Morocco) is a Moroccan boxer who competed at the 2012 Summer Olympics in the light flyweight division where he lost to Thomas Essomba in the first round.
