= Abdelhak Aatkani =

Moroccan boxer (born 1988)

Personal information
- Nationality: Morocco
- Born: 9 February 1988 (age 38) Aïn Sebaâ

Sport
- Sport: Boxing
Medal record
Men's amateur boxing
Representing Morocco
African Championships
Silver medal – second place	2015 Casablanca	Light welterweight

Abdelhak Aatakni (born 9 February 1988 in Aïn Sebaâ) is a Moroccan boxer. He competed at the 2012 Summer Olympics in the men's light welterweight, but was defeated in the first round by Richarno Colin of Mauritius.
