= Abdon Mewoli =

Cameroonian boxer (born 1985)

Yhyacinthe Mewoli Abdon
Personal information
- Nationality: Cameroon
- Born: 18 October 1985 (age 40) Etoa, Cameroon
- Height: 176 cm (69 in)
- Weight: 60 kg (130 lb)

Sport
- Sport: Boxing
- Event: Lightweight
- Turned pro: 2014
Medal record
Men's Boxing
Representing Cameroon
All-Africa Games
| Bronze medal – third place | 2011 Maputo | Lightweight |
African Championships
| Silver medal – second place | 2011 Yaoundé | Lightweight |

Yhyacinthe Mewoli Abdon (born 18 October 1985 in Etoa) is a Cameroonian professional boxer. He competed in the lightweight event at the 2012 Summer Olympics and was eliminated in the round of 32 by Fazliddin Gaibnazarov. After his defeat, he was one of seven Cameroonian athletes who disappeared from the Olympic Village. He told media he wanted to stay in the UK to further his career. He was granted asylum and settled in Stockton-on-Tees.

== Professional career ==
He turned pro in 2014, and began competing under name Abdon Cesar.

== Professional boxing record ==
| 12 fights | 3 wins | 9 losses |
|---|---|---|
| By knockout | 0 | 2 |
| By decision | 3 | 7 |

| No. | Result | Record | Opponent | Type | Round, time | Date | Location | Notes |
|---|---|---|---|---|---|---|---|---|
| 12 | Lose | 3-9 | (England) Sam Bowen | RTD | 1 (8) | 16 Sep 2016 | Metrodome, Barnsley, United Kingdom | |
| 11 | Lose | 3-8 | (England) Peter Cope | PTS | 8 | 25 Jun 2016 | Gateshead Leisure Centre, Gateshead, United Kingdom | |
| 10 | Lose | 3-7 | (Scotland) Charlie Flynn | PTS | 4 | 28 May 2016 | SSE Hydro, Glasgow, United Kingdom | |
| 9 | Lose | 3-6 | (England) Joe Murray | TKO | 2 (6) | 23 Apr 2016 | Devonshire Dome, Buxton, United Kingdom | |
| 8 | Lose | 3-5 | (England) Maxi Hughes | PTS | 6 | 23 Oct 2015 | Devonshire Dome, Buxton, United Kingdom | |
| 7 | Win | 3-4 | (England) Jack Heath | PTS | 4 | 7 Feb 2015 | Gateshead Leisure Centre, Gateshead, United Kingdom | |
| 6 | Win | 2-4 | (England) Atif Shafiq | PTS | 8 | 14 Nov 2014 | IceSheffield, Sheffield, United Kingdom | |
| 5 | Win | 1-4 | (Scotland) Ryan Collins | PTS | 6 | 20 Sep 2014 | Park Hotel, Kilmarnock, United Kingdom | |
| 4 | Lose | 0-4 | (England) Kofi Yates | PTS | 4 | 12 Jul 2014 | Holte Suite, Birmingham, United Kingdom | |
| 3 | Lose | 0-3 | (England) Lewis Browning | PTS | 6 | 21 Jun 2014 | Riviera International Conference Centre, Torquay, United Kingdom | |
| 2 | Lose | 0-2 | (Scotland) Jordan McCorry | PTS | 4 | 6 Jun 2014 | Ravenscraig Regional Sports Facility, Motherwell, United Kingdom | |
| 1 | Lose | 0-1 | (Scotland) Ally Black | PTS | 4 | 17 May 2014 | Park Hotel, Kilmarnock, United Kingdom | Professional debut |
