= Badreddine Haddioui =

Moroccan boxer

Badreddine Haddioui (born 25 December 1988, Mohammédia) is a Moroccan boxer. At the 2012 Summer Olympics, he competed in the Men's middleweight, but was defeated in the first round.
