= Serge Ambomo =

Cameroonian boxer

Serge Ambomo (born 2 July 1986 in Ngoksa) is a Cameroonian boxer. He competed in the light welterweight event at the 2012 Summer Olympics and was eliminated in the round of 32 by Yakup Şener. After his defeat, he was one of seven Cameroonian athletes who disappeared from the Olympic Village. After appearing at a local boxing gym a week after his disappearance along with four other boxers, he applied for asylum in the UK. His first application failed, but he was later allowed to stay in the UK.

He turned professional in November 2013, starting his career with a points win over Matt Seawright on 30 November 2013. He has boxed regularly since, amassing a total of 51 bouts on his record. He currently lives in Sheffield.

== Professional Boxing Record ==
51 fights	9 wins	39 losses
By knockout	4	4
By decision	5	35
Draws	3	
