= 2011 World Amateur Boxing Championships – Bantamweight =

Boxing competitions

The Bantamweight competition was the third-lightest class featured at the 2011 World Amateur Boxing Championships, held at the Heydar Aliyev Sports and Exhibition Complex. Boxers were limited to a maximum of 56 kilograms (123 lb) in body mass.

The eight quarter-finalists qualified, subject to continental quotas, to compete at this weight at the 2012 Summer Olympics.

== Medalists ==
| Gold | Lázaro Álvarez (CUB) |
| Silver | Luke Campbell (ENG) |
| Bronze | John Joe Nevin (IRL) |
| Bronze | Anvar Yunusov (TJK) |

== Seeds ==
1. (Bulgaria) Detelin Dalakliev (quarterfinals)
2. (Mexico) Oscar Valdez (third round)
3. (Russia) Sergey Vodopyanov (quarterfinals)
4. (Republic of Ireland) John Joe Nevin (semifinals)
5. (Moldova) Veaceslav Gojan (third round)
6. (Tajikistan) Anvar Yunusov (semifinals)
7. (Italy) Jahyn Parrinello (third round)
8. (Azerbaijan) Rahim Najafov (first round)
9. (Algeria) Mohamed Ouadahi (second round)
10. (Germany) Denis Makarov (second round)

== Draw ==
=== Finals ===
Semifinals
1 | Luke Campbell (ENG) | +12
4 | John Joe Nevin (IRL) | 12
3 | Anvar Yunusov (TJK) | 13
2 | Lázaro Álvarez (CUB) | 18

Final
Luke Campbell (ENG) | 10
Lázaro Álvarez (CUB) | 14

=== Top Half ===
==== Section 1 ====
Round 1
Dawid Michelius (POL) | 13
Ruwan Weerakkodige (SRI) | 5
Omurbek Malabekov (KGZ) | 24
Joselito Aguirre (GUA) | 17
Anthony Bret (FRA) | 21
Othman Arbabi (QAT) | 4
Mohamed Ouadahi (ALG) | 18
Atanas Mugerwa (UGA) | 10
Bashir Hassan Salad (SWE) | 12
Louis Julie (MRI) | 9
Dmitrijs Gutmans (LAT) | 6
Nicolae Andreiana (ROM) | 17
Luke Campbell (ENG) | 17
Rahim Najafov (AZE) | 7

Round 2
Detelin Dalakliev (BUL) | 19
Dawid Michelius (POL) | 7
Omurbek Malabekov (KGZ) | 15
Anthony Bret (FRA) | 14
Mohamed Ouadahi (ALG) | 18
Bashir Hassan Salad (SWE) | 10
Nicolae Andreiana (ROM) | 7
Luke Campbell (ENG) | 17

Round 3
Detelin Dalakliev (BUL) | 16
Omurbek Malabekov (KGZ) | 14
Mohamed Ouadahi (ALG) | 9
Luke Campbell (ENG) | 11

Quarterfinals
Detelin Dalakliev (BUL) | 8
Luke Campbell (ENG) | 12

==== Section 2 ====
Round 1
Aboubakr Lbida (MAR) | 19
Syed Hussain (PAK) | 8
Orzubek Shayimov (UZB) | 22
Mykola Butsenko (UKR) | 13
Mohamed Farag (EGY) | 11
Angel Rodriguez (VEN) | 20
Otgondalai Dorjnyambuu (MGL) | 24
Hovhannes Bachkov (ARM) | 13
Lee Jin-young (KOR) | 14
Dennis Ceylan (DEN) | 10
Filip Barak (SVK) | 8
Akhil Kumar (IND) | 16

Round 2
Veaceslav Gojan (MDA) | 19
Aboubakr Lbida (MAR) | 14
Orzubek Shayimov (UZB) | 10
Angel Rodriguez (VEN) | 9
Otgondalai Dorjnyambuu (MGL) | 15
Lee Jin-young (KOR) | 3
Akhil Kumar (IND) | 14
John Joe Nevin (IRL) | 21

Round 3
Veaceslav Gojan (MDA) | 8
Orzubek Shayimov (UZB) | 13
Otgondalai Dorjnyambuu (MGL) | 18
John Joe Nevin (IRL) | +18

Quarterfinals
Orzubek Shayimov (UZB) | 17
John Joe Nevin (IRL) | 19

=== Bottom Half ===
==== Section 3 ====
Round 1
Julio Deivis (COL) | 23
Seif Qraish (JOR) | 15
Zhang Jiawei (CHN) | 18
Armin Amjadian (IRI) | 9
Joan Tipon (PHI) | 13
Alberto Melián (ARG) | 12
Luke Boyd (AUS) | 17
Giorgi Kilanava (GEO) | 10
Koffi Yoboue (CIV)
Norbert Kalucza (HUN) | RSC
Furkhan Memis (TUR) | 12
Sean McGoldrick (WAL) | 10

Round 2
Sergey Vodopyanov (RUS) | 26
Julio Deivis (COL) | 13
Zhang Jiawei (CHN) | 17
Joan Tipon (PHI) | 8
Luke Boyd (AUS) | 24
Norbert Kalucza (HUN) | 22
Furkhan Memis (TUR)
Anvar Yunusov (TJK) | RSC

Round 3
Sergey Vodopyanov (RUS) | 18
Zhang Jiawei (CHN) | 12
Luke Boyd (AUS) | 7
Anvar Yunusov (TJK) | 17

Quarterfinals
Sergey Vodopyanov (RUS) | 9
Anvar Yunusov (TJK) | 19

==== Section 4 ====
Round 1
Mohammad Latifi (AFG)
Satoshi Shimizu (JPN) | RSC
Lázaro Álvarez (CUB) | 18
Robenílson Vieira (BRA) | 13
Rafly Langi (INA)
Denis Makarov (GER) | WO
Ayabonga Sonjica (RSA) | 7
Worapoj Petchkoom (THA) | 16
Joseph Diaz (USA) | RSCH
Kyaw Latt (MYA)
Dzmitry Zhukau (BLR) | 12
Matar Sambou (SEN) | 3

Round 2
Jahyn Parrinello (ITA) | 22
Satoshi Shimizu (JPN) | 13
Lázaro Álvarez (CUB) | 13
Denis Makarov (GER) | 8
Worapoj Petchkoom (THA) | 21
Joseph Diaz (USA) | 24
Dzmitry Zhukau (BLR)
Oscar Valdez (MEX) | RSC

Round 3
Jahyn Parrinello (ITA) | 11
Lázaro Álvarez (CUB) | 13
Joseph Diaz (USA) | 22
Oscar Valdez (MEX) | 21

Quarterfinals
Lázaro Álvarez (CUB) | 19
Joseph Diaz (USA) | 10
