= Boxing at the 2008 Summer Olympics – Bantamweight =

The bantamweight competition was the third-lowest weight class featured in amateur boxing at the 2008 Summer Olympics, and was held at the Workers Indoor Arena. Bantamweights were limited to a maximum of 54 kilograms in body mass.

Like all Olympic boxing events, the competition was a straight single-elimination tournament. Both semifinal losers were awarded bronze medals, so no boxers competed again after their first loss. Bouts consisted of four rounds of two minutes each, with one-minute breaks between rounds. Punches scored only if the white area on the front of the glove made full contact with the front of the head or torso of the opponent. Five judges scored each bout; three of the judges had to signal a scoring punch within one second for the punch to score. The winner of the bout was the boxer who scored the most valid punches by the end of the bout.

== Participants ==
- Khavazhi Khatsigov (Belarus) replaced Gary Russell Jr. (USA) at the last moment due to injury of the American.

== Medalists ==
| Gold | Enkhbatyn Badar-Uugan; Mongolia |
| Silver | Yankiel León; Cuba |
| Bronze | Bruno Julie; Mauritius |
| Bronze | Veaceslav Gojan; Moldova |

== Draw ==
All times are China Standard Time (UTC+8)

Round of 32; Tuesday, August 12, 2008; 15:00-16:15 & 20:30-22:00
Issah Samir (GHA) | 10
Héctor Manzanilla (VEN) | 13
Bruno Julie (MRI) | 17
Emanuel Thabiso Nketu (LES) | 8
Rustamhodza Rahimov (GER) | 2
Hoorshid Tojibaev (UZB) | 11
Gu Yu (CHN) | 17
Joe Murray (GBR) | 7
Khavazhi Khatsigov (BLR) | 1
Veaceslav Gojan (MDA) | +1
Sergey Vodopyanov (RUS) | 10
McJoe Arroyo (PUR) | 5
Ali Hallab (FRA) | 5
Akhil Kumar (IND) | 12
Luke Boyd (AUS) | 8
Khumiso Ikgopoleng (BOT) | 18
Hicham Mesbahi (MAR) | 11
Jonatan Romero (COL) | 3
Abdelhalim Ouradi (ALG) | 4
John Joe Nevin (IRL) | 9
Enkhbatyn Badar-Uugan (MGL) | 15
Óscar Valdez (MEX) | 4

Round of 16; Friday, August 15, 2008; 19:00-21:00
Worapoj Petchkoom (THA) | 12
Vittorio Parrinello (ITA) | 1
Kanat Abutalipov (KAZ) | 3
Yankiel León (CUB) | 10
Han Soon Chul (KOR) | 6
Héctor Manzanilla (VEN) | 17
Bruno Julie (MRI) | 16
Hoorshid Tojibaev (UZB) | 4
Gu Yu (CHN) | 6
Veaceslav Gojan (MDA) | 13
Sergey Vodopyanov (RUS) | 9
Akhil Kumar (IND) | 9+
Khumiso Ikgopoleng (BOT) | RSCI
Hicham Mesbahi (MAR)
John Joe Nevin (IRL) | 2
Enkhbatyn Badar-Uugan (MGL) | 9

Quarterfinals; Monday, August 18, 2008; 19:00-20:00
Worapoj Petchkoom (THA) | 2
Yankiel León (CUB) | 10
Héctor Manzanilla (VEN) | 9
Bruno Julie (MRI) | 13
Veaceslav Gojan (MDA) | 10
Akhil Kumar (IND) | 3
Khumiso Ikgopoleng (BOT) | 2
Enkhbatyn Badar-Uugan (MGL) | 15

Semifinals; Friday, August 22, 2008; 19:30-20:00
Yankiel León (CUB) | 7
Bruno Julie (MRI) | 5
Veaceslav Gojan (MDA) | 2
Enkhbatyn Badar-Uugan (MGL) | 15

Final; Sunday, August 24, 2008; 14:05-14:25
Yankiel León (CUB) | 5
Enkhbatyn Badar-Uugan (MGL) | 16

== See also ==
- 2009 World Amateur Boxing Championships – Bantamweight
