= 2009 World Amateur Boxing Championships – Bantamweight =

Boxing competitions

The bantamweight competition was the third-lowest weight class featured at the 2009 World Amateur Boxing Championships, and was held at the Mediolanum Forum. Bantamweights were limited to a maximum of 54 kilograms in body mass.

== Medalists ==
| Gold | Detelin Dalakliev; Bulgaria |
| Silver | Eduard Abzalimov; Russia |
| Bronze | Yankiel León; Cuba |
| Bronze | John Nevin; Ireland |

== Seeds ==
1. (Cuba) Yankiel León (semifinals)
2. (Algeria) Abdelhalim Ouradi (third round)
3. (Moldova) Veaceslav Gojan (second round)
4. (Bulgaria) Detelin Dalakliev (champion)
5. (Uzbekistan) Tulashboy Doniyorov (quarterfinals)
6. (Tajikistan) Anvar Yunusov (second round)
7. (Republic of Ireland) John Joe Nevin (semifinals)
8. (Kazakhstan) Kanat Abutalipov (quarterfinals)

== Draw ==
=== Finals ===
Quarterfinals
Yankiel León (CUB) | 2
Kanat Abutalipov (KAZ) | 0
Tulashboy Doniyorov (UZB) | 1
Detelin Dalakliev (BUL) | 3
Gu Yu (CHN) | 5
John Nevin (IRL) | 7
Chatchai Butdee (THA) | 6
Eduard Abzalimov (RUS) | 11

Semifinals
Yankiel León (CUB) | 0
Detelin Dalakliev (BUL) | 5
John Nevin (IRL) | 4
Eduard Abzalimov (RUS) | 5

Final
Detelin Dalakliev (BUL) | 5
Eduard Abzalimov (RUS) | 3

=== Top half ===
==== Section 1 ====
Round 1

Round 2
Yankiel León (CUB) | 11
Lee Jin Young (KOR) | 2
Razvan Andreiana (ROU) | 7
Thomas Kasina (KEN) | 3
Giorgi Kilanava (GEO) | 10
Krisztian Lakatos (HUN) | 16
Hicham Mesbahi (MAR) | 3
Kanat Abutalipov (KAZ) | 15

Round 3
Yankiel León (CUB) | 12
Razvan Andreiana (ROU) | 9
Krisztian Lakatos (HUN)
Kanat Abutalipov (KAZ) | RSC

Quarterfinals
Yankiel León (CUB) | 2
Kanat Abutalipov (KAZ) | 0

==== Section 2 ====
Round 1
Sinapapa Sanele (SAM) | 9
Braeir Lemboumba (GAB) | 15
Jesus Magdaleno (USA) | 26
Dimitrijs Gutmans (LAT) | 7
Vittorio Parrinello (ITA) | 5
Denis Makarov (GER) | 8
Mehmet Topcakan (TUR) | 6
Alberto Melián (ARG) | 2
Nadim Hossen (BAN) | 4
Hikaru Marugame (JPN) | 14
Arthur Mbengua (CAF)
Andrew Selby (WAL) | WO
Tran Viet Quock (VIE) | 0
Detelin Dalakliev (BUL) | 8

Round 2
Tulashboy Doniyorov (UZB) | 11
Braeir Lemboumba (GAB) | 4
Jesus Magdaleno (USA) | 8
Denis Makarov (GER) | 11
Mehmet Topcakan (TUR) | 12
Hikaru Marugame (JPN) | 3
Andrew Selby (WAL) | 0
Detelin Dalakliev (BUL) | 3

Round 3
Tulashboy Doniyorov (UZB) | 8
Denis Makarov (GER) | 3
Mehmet Topcakan (TUR) | 1
Detelin Dalakliev (BUL) | 7

Quarterfinals
Tulashboy Doniyorov (UZB) | 1
Detelin Dalakliev (BUL) | 3

=== Bottom half ===
==== Section 3 ====
Round 1
Veaceslav Gojan (MDA) | +5
Matti Koota (FIN) | 5
Gu Yu (CHN) | 10
Claudio Marrero Guzman (DOM) | 5
McJoe Arroyo (PUR) | 13
Martin Parlagi (SVK) | 3
Salomo Ntuve (SWE) | 1
Pedro Matos (POR) | 6
Enkhjargalyn Iderkhüü (MGL) | 16
Khavazhi Khatsigov (BLR) | 7
Luke Campbell (ENG) | 17
Rey Vargas (MEX) | 13
Nikola Magovac (SRB) | 13
Omurbek Malabekov (KGZ) | 10
Rahim Najafov (AZE) | 4
John Nevin (IRL) | 19

Round 2
Veaceslav Gojan (MDA) | 3
Gu Yu (CHN) | 12
McJoe Arroyo (PUR) | 19
Pedro Matos (POR) | 3
Enkhjargalyn Iderkhüü (MGL) | 11
Luke Campbell (ENG) | 9
Nikola Magovac (SRB) | 3
John Nevin (IRL) | 14

Round 3
Gu Yu (CHN) | 10
McJoe Arroyo (PUR) | 3
Enkhjargalyn Iderkhüü (MGL) | 4
John Nevin (IRL) | 10

Quarterfinals
Gu Yu (CHN) | 5
John Nevin (IRL) | 7

==== Section 4 ====
Round 1
Anvar Yunusov (TJK) | DSQ
Jitender Kumar (IND)
Chatchai Butdee (THA) | 19
Emmanuel Quartey (GHA) | 2
Wessam Salamana (SYR) | RSC
Ponce David Alberto (HON)
Gamik Harutunyan (ARM) | 18
Simanga Shiba (SWZ) | 13
Georgiy Chygayev (UKR) | 4
Eduard Abzalimov (RUS) | 9
Mohammd Alwadi (JOR) | 25
Trejos Espinoza (CHI) | 2
Joan Tipon (PHI) | 8
Kamal Gamaethiralalage (SRI) | 3
Matius Mandiangan (INA) | 3
Abdelhalim Ouradi (ALG) | 16

Round 2
Anvar Tunusov (TJK) | 5
Chatchai Butdee (THA) | 7
Wessam Salamana (SYR) | 16
Gamik Harutyunyan (ARM) | 14
Eduard Abzalimov (RUS) | 7
Mohammd Alwadi (JOR) | 2
Joan Tipon (PHI) | 0
Abdelhalim Ouradi (ALG) | 2

Round 3
Chatchai Butdee (THA) | 15
Wessam Salamana (SYR) | 4
Eduard Abzalimov (RUS) | 7
Abdelhalim Ouradi (ALG) | 0

Quarterfinals
Chatchai Butdee (THA) | 6
Eduard Abzalimov (RUS) | 11

== See also ==
- Boxing at the 2008 Summer Olympics – Bantamweight
