= Moldova at the 2008 Summer Olympics =

- IOC code: MDA
- NOC: National Olympic Committee of the Republic of Moldova
- Website: www.olympic.md (in Romanian)

in Beijing
- Competitors: 29 in 8 sports
- Flag bearer: Nicolae Ceban
- Medals Ranked 80th: Gold 0 Silver 0 Bronze 1 Total 1

Summer Olympics appearances (overview)
- 1996; 2000; 2004; 2008; 2012; 2016; 2020; 2024

Other related appearances
- Russian Empire (1900–1912); Romania (1924–1936); Soviet Union (1952–1988); Unified Team (1992)

Moldova competed in the 2008 Summer Olympics. Moldova won one medal at the games, a bronze for boxer bantamweight Veaceslav Gojan.

== Medalists ==
Medal	Name	Sport	Event
Bronze	Veaceslav Gojan	Boxing	Bantamweight

== Athletics ==
Key

- Note–Ranks given for track events are within the athlete's heat only
- Q = Qualified for the next round
- q = Qualified for the next round as a fastest loser or, in field events, by position without achieving the qualifying target
- NR = National record
- N/A = Round not applicable for the event
- Bye = Athlete not required to compete in round

Men
Track & road events

Athlete	Event	Heat		Final	
Athlete	Event	Result	Rank	Result	Rank
Fedosei Ciumacenco	20 km walk	—		1:31:37	47
Ion Luchianov	3000 m steeplechase	8:18.97	7 q	8:27.82	12
Iaroslav Musinschi	Marathon	—		2:21:18	41

Field events

Athlete	Event	Qualification		Final	
Athlete	Event	Distance	Position	Distance	Position
Ivan Emilianov	Shot put	18.64	35	Did not advance	
Vadim Hranovschi	Discus throw	56.19	26	Did not advance	
Vladimir Letnicov	Triple jump	16.62	24	Did not advance	
Roman Rozna	Hammer throw	71.33	33	Did not advance	

Combined events – Decathlon

Athlete	Event	100 m	LJ	SP	HJ	400 m	110H	DT	PV	JT	1500 m	Final	Rank
Victor Covalenco	Result	11.87	6.50	13.44	DNF	DNS	—	—	—	—	—	DNF	
Victor Covalenco	Points	677	697	694	0	0	—	—	—	—	—	DNF	

Women
Track & road events

Athlete	Event	Heat		Semifinal		Final	
Athlete	Event	Result	Rank	Result	Rank	Result	Rank
Olga Cristea	800 m	2:00.59	4 q	2:00.12	6	Did not advance	
Valentina Delion	Marathon	—				DNF	
Oxana Juravel	3000 m steeplechase	10:04.38	13	—		Did not advance	

Field events

Athlete	Event	Qualification		Final	
Athlete	Event	Distance	Position	Distance	Position
Inna Gliznuţa	High jump	1.80	=29	Did not advance	
Marina Marghieva	Hammer throw	62.12	43	Did not advance	
Zalina Marghieva	Hammer throw	64.20	37	Did not advance	

== Boxing ==
Moldova qualified two boxers for the Olympic boxing tournament. Grusac was the first, qualifying at the World Championships. Gojan was the second, qualifying at the first European qualifier.

Athlete	Event	Round of 32	Round of 16	Quarterfinals	Semifinals	Final	
Athlete	Event	Opposition Result	Opposition Result	Opposition Result	Opposition Result	Opposition Result	Rank
Veaceslav Gojan	Bantamweight	Khatsigov (BLR); W 1^{+}–1	Gu Y (CHN); W 13–6	Kumar (IND); W 10–3	Badar-Uugan (MGL); L 2–15	Did not advance	3rd place, bronze medalist(s)
Vitalie Gruşac	Welterweight	O'Mahony (AUS); W 7–2	Sarsekbayev (KAZ); L RSC	Did not advance			

== Cycling ==
=== Road ===
Athlete	Event	Time	Rank
Alexandr Pliuschin	Men's road race	6:39:42	76

=== Track ===
Pursuit

Athlete	Event	Qualification		Semifinals		Final	
Athlete	Event	Time	Rank	Opponent Results	Rank	Opponent Results	Rank
Alexandr Pliuschin	Men's individual pursuit	4:35.438	17	Did not advance			

== Judo ==
Athlete	Event	Round of 32	Round of 16	Quarterfinals	Semifinals	Repechage 1	Repechage 2	Repechage 3	Final / BM	
Athlete	Event	Opposition Result	Opposition Result	Opposition Result	Opposition Result	Opposition Result	Opposition Result	Opposition Result	Opposition Result	Rank
Sergiu Toma	−73 kg	Kevkhishvili (GEO); L 0010–0021	Did not advance							

== Shooting ==
Men

Athlete	Event	Qualification		Final	
Athlete	Event	Points	Rank	Points	Rank
Ghenadie Lisoconi	25 m rapid fire pistol	567	12	Did not advance	

== Swimming ==
Men

Athlete	Event	Heat		Semifinal		Final	
Athlete	Event	Time	Rank	Time	Rank	Time	Rank
Sergiu Postică	100 m breaststroke	1:03.83	54	Did not advance			
Andrei Zaharov	200 m freestyle	1:58.62	55	Did not advance			

Women

Athlete	Event	Heat		Semifinal		Final	
Athlete	Event	Time	Rank	Time	Rank	Time	Rank
Veronica Vdovicenco	50 m freestyle	26.92	50	Did not advance			

== Weightlifting ==
Athlete	Event	Snatch		Clean & Jerk		Total	Rank
Athlete	Event	Result	Rank	Result	Rank	Total	Rank
Igor Grabucea	Men's −56 kg	109	16	130	15	239	15
Alexandru Dudoglo	Men's −69 kg	145	11	172	9	317	9
Andrei Gutu	Men's −77 kg	145	17	160	21	305	20
Eugen Bratan	Men's −94 kg	170	12	200	13	370	13
Vadim Vacarciuc	Men's −94 kg	168	13	205	12	373	12

== Wrestling ==
Key:

- VT - Victory by Fall.
- PP - Decision by Points - the loser with technical points.
- PO - Decision by Points - the loser without technical points.

Men's freestyle

Athlete	Event	Qualification	Round of 16	Quarterfinal	Semifinal	Repechage 1	Repechage 2	Final / BM	
Athlete	Event	Opposition Result	Opposition Result	Opposition Result	Opposition Result	Opposition Result	Opposition Result	Opposition Result	Rank
Nicolae Ceban	−96 kg	Kiss (HUN); L 1–3 ^{PP}	Did not advance						12

Women's freestyle

Athlete	Event	Round of 16	Quarterfinal	Semifinal	Repechage 1	Repechage 2	Final / BM	
Athlete	Event	Opposition Result	Opposition Result	Opposition Result	Opposition Result	Opposition Result	Opposition Result	Rank
Ludmila Cristea	−55 kg	Andrades (VEN); W 3–1 ^{PP}	Verbeek (CAN); L 1–3 ^{PP}	Did not advance				10
