= Mongolia at the 2008 Summer Olympics =

- IOC code: MGL
- NOC: Mongolian National Olympic Committee
- Website: www.olympic.mn (in Mongolian)

in Beijing
- Competitors: 29 in 7 sports
- Flag bearers: Makhgalyn Bayarjavkhlan (opening); Enkhbatyn Badar-Uugan (closing)
- Medals Ranked 33rd: Gold 2 Silver 2 Bronze 0 Total 4

Summer Olympics appearances (overview)
- 1964; 1968; 1972; 1976; 1980; 1984; 1988; 1992; 1996; 2000; 2004; 2008; 2012; 2016; 2020; 2024

Mongolia competed in the 2008 Summer Olympics, held in Beijing, China, from August 8 to August 24, 2008. 29 athletes represented the country and competed in seven events. The Beijing Olympics has been Mongolia's most successful games ever, winning two gold and two silver medals, exceeding the 1980 Moscow Olympics where the nation won two silver and two bronze medals.

== Medalists ==
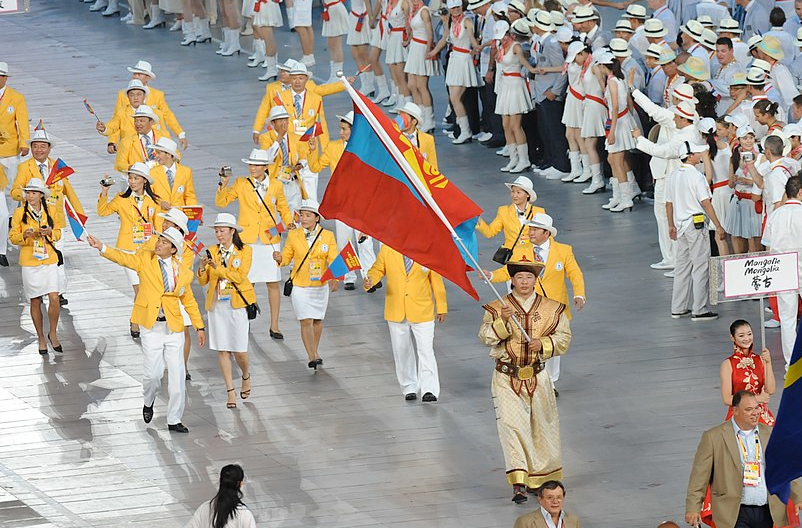
The Olympic Team of Mongolia at the opening ceremony of the 2008 Beijing Summer Olympics

Judoka Naidangiin Tüvshinbayar became the first Mongolian ever to win an Olympic gold medal. Otryadin Gündegmaa won Mongolia's first silver since the 1980 Moscow Games. Pürevdorjiin Serdamba won Mongolia's first silver medal in boxing. He was followed by Enkhbatyn Badar-Uugan, who won Mongolia's first gold medal in boxing, and second gold medal overall.

Medal	Name	Sport	Event
Gold	Naidangiin Tüvshinbayar	Judo	Men's 100 kg
Gold	Enkhbatyn Badar-Uugan	Boxing	Bantamweight
Silver	Otryadyn Gündegmaa	Shooting	Women's 25 m pistol
Silver	Pürevdorjiin Serdamba	Boxing	Light flyweight

== Athletics ==
Key

- Note–Ranks given for track events are within the athlete's heat only
- Q = Qualified for the next round
- q = Qualified for the next round as a fastest loser or, in field events, by position without achieving the qualifying target
- NR = National record
- N/A = Round not applicable for the event
- Bye = Athlete not required to compete in round

Men

Athlete	Event	Final	
Athlete	Event	Result	Rank
Bat-Ochir Ser-Od	Marathon	2:24:19	52

Women

Athlete	Event	Heat		Semifinal		Final	
Athlete	Event	Result	Rank	Result	Rank	Result	Rank
Batgereliin Möngöntuyaa	400 m	58.14	8	Did not advance			

== Boxing ==
Mongolia qualified four boxers for the Olympic boxing tournament. Badar-Uugan was the first to qualify, doing so at the 2007 World Championships. All three of the others qualified at the second Asian continental qualifying tournament.

Athlete	Event	Round of 32	Round of 16	Quarterfinals	Semifinals	Final	
Athlete	Event	Opposition Result	Opposition Result	Opposition Result	Opposition Result	Opposition Result	Rank
Pürevdorjiin Serdamba	Light flyweight	Serugo (UGA); W 9–5	Yáñez (USA); W 8–7	Ruenroeng (THA); W 5–2	Hernández (CUB); W 8^{+}–8	Zou (CHN); L RET	2nd place, silver medalist(s)
Enkhbatyn Badar-Uugan	Bantamweight	Valdez (MEX); W 15–4	Nevin (IRL); W 9–2	Ikgopoleng (BOT); W 15–2	Gojan (MDA); W 15–2	León (CUB); W 16–5	1st place, gold medalist(s)
Zorigtbaataryn Enkhzorig	Featherweight	Ouatine (MAR); W 10–1	Torriente (CUB); L 9–10	Did not advance			
Uranchimegiin Mönkh-Erdene	Light welterweight	Bwalya (ZAM); W 12–8	Georgiev (BUL); W 10–3	Vastine (FRA); L 4–12	Did not advance		

== Judo ==
Mongolia received 10 qualifications for Judo at the Asian Championships, and qualified them by test matches.

Men

Athlete	Event	Preliminary	Round of 32	Round of 16	Quarterfinals	Semifinals	Repechage 1	Repechage 2	Repechage 3	Final / BM	
Athlete	Event	Opposition Result	Opposition Result	Opposition Result	Opposition Result	Opposition Result	Opposition Result	Opposition Result	Opposition Result	Opposition Result	Rank
Khashbaataryn Tsagaanbaatar	−60 kg	Bye	Yekutiel (ISR); L 0000–0001	Did not advance							
Gantömöriin Dashdavaa	−73 kg	—N/a	Reser (USA); W 0111–0100	Wilkomirski (POL); W 0012–0010	Maloumat (IRI); L 0010–1100	Did not advance	Bye	Kanamaru (JPN); L 0000–0100	Did not advance		
Damdinsürengiin Nyamkhüü	−81 kg	Bye	Elmont (NED); L 0000–0001	Did not advance			Maddaloni (ITA); W 1000–0000	Mrvaljević (MNE); W 1002–0000	Krawczyk (POL); W 1010–0001	Gontiuk (UKR); L 0100–0110	5
Naidangiin Tüvshinbayar	−100 kg	—N/a	Suzuki (JPN); W 1000–0000	Behrla (GER); W 0021–0001	Jang (KOR); W 0011–0010	Miraliyev (AZE); W 0010–0000	Bye			Zhitkeyev (KAZ); W 0120–0010	1st place, gold medalist(s)
Makhgalyn Bayarjavkhlan	+100 kg	Bye	Wojnarowicz (POL); L 0000–1000	Did not advance							

Women

Athlete	Event	Round of 32	Round of 16	Quarterfinals	Semifinals	Repechage 1	Repechage 2	Repechage 3	Final / BM	
Athlete	Event	Opposition Result	Opposition Result	Opposition Result	Opposition Result	Opposition Result	Opposition Result	Opposition Result	Opposition Result	Rank
Mönkhbaataryn Bundmaa	−52 kg	Carrascosa (ESP); L 0000–0100	Did not advance							
Khishigbatyn Erdenet-Od	−57 kg	Bye	Quintavalle (ITA); L 0001–1010	Did not advance		Bönisch (GER); L 0001–0110	Did not advance			
Tümen-Odyn Battögs	−63 kg	Bye	von Harnier (GER); L 0000–1001	Did not advance						
Pürevjargalyn Lkhamdegd	−78 kg	Bye	Yang Xl (CHN); L 0000–1021	Did not advance		Proskurakova (KGZ); W 0230–0000	Levesque (CAN); W 0110–0101	Silva (BRA); L 0010–1131	Did not advance	
Dorjgotovyn Tserenkhand	+78 kg	Bye	Ulienhoed (NED); W 0010–0001	Polavder (SLO); L 0000–1100	Did not advance	Bye	Issanova (KAZ); W 1000–0000	Mondière (FRA); W 1000–0000	Ortiz (CUB); L 0000–1000	5

== Shooting ==
Women

Athlete	Event	Qualification		Final	
Athlete	Event	Points	Rank	Points	Rank
Zorigtyn Batkhuyag	10 m air rifle	394	22	Did not advance	
Zorigtyn Batkhuyag	50 m rifle 3 positions	570	33	Did not advance	
Otryadyn Gündegmaa	10 m air pistol	382	12	Did not advance	
Otryadyn Gündegmaa	25 m pistol	590	1 Q	792.2	2nd place, silver medalist(s)
Tsogbadrakhyn Mönkhzul	10 m air pistol	387	3 Q	479.6	8
Tsogbadrakhyn Mönkhzul	25 m pistol	581	12	Did not advance	

== Swimming ==
Mongolia selected two athletes by granting wild card entries.

Men

Athlete	Event	Heat		Semifinal		Final	
Athlete	Event	Time	Rank	Time	Rank	Time	Rank
Boldbaataryn Bütekh-Üils	100 m breaststroke	1:10.80	60	Did not advance			

Women

Athlete	Event	Heat		Semifinal		Final	
Athlete	Event	Time	Rank	Time	Rank	Time	Rank
Dashtserengiin Saintsetseg	50 m freestyle	29.63	67	Did not advance			

== Weightlifting ==
Athlete	Event	Snatch		Clean & Jerk		Total	Rank
Athlete	Event	Result	Rank	Result	Rank	Total	Rank
Namkhaidorjiin Bayarmaa	Women's −63 kg	90	11	123	6	213	9

== Wrestling ==
Key:

- VT - Victory by Fall.
- PP - Decision by Points - the loser with technical points.
- PO - Decision by Points - the loser without technical points.

Men's freestyle

Athlete	Event	Qualification	Round of 16	Quarterfinal	Semifinal	Repechage 1	Repechage 2	Final / BM	
Athlete	Event	Opposition Result	Opposition Result	Opposition Result	Opposition Result	Opposition Result	Opposition Result	Opposition Result	Rank
Bayaraagiin Naranbaatar	−55 kg	Bye	Kudukhov (RUS); L 0–3 ^{PO}	Did not advance					16
Buyanjavyn Batzorig	−66 kg	Barnes (RSA); W 3–1 ^{PP}	Farniev (RUS); L 1–3 ^{PP}	Did not advance					8
Chagnaadorjiin Ganzorig	−84 kg	Temrezov (AZE); L 1–3 ^{PP}	Did not advance						17

Women's freestyle

Athlete	Event	Qualification	Round of 16	Quarterfinal	Semifinal	Repechage 1	Repechage 2	Final / BM	
Athlete	Event	Opposition Result	Opposition Result	Opposition Result	Opposition Result	Opposition Result	Opposition Result	Opposition Result	Rank
Tsogtbazaryn Enkhjargal	−48 kg	Bye	Merleni (UKR); L 0–5 ^{VT}	Did not advance					16
Naidangiin Otgonjargal	−55 kg	—N/a	Verbeek (CAN); L 1–3 ^{PP}	Did not advance					16
Badrakhyn Odonchimeg	−63 kg	Bye	Xu Hy (CHN); L 1–3 ^{PP}	Did not advance					10

== Other Mongolians ==
Athlete	Representing	Event	Result
Munkhbayar Dorjsuren	Germany	25 metre pistol	Bronze

== See also ==
- Mongolia at the Olympics
