= 2nd AIBA European 2008 Olympic Qualifying Tournament =

Boxing competition held in Greece

- Venues: 1
- Location: Greece
- Dates: 7 – 12 April
- Teams: 21
- Website: tournament website

2nd AIBA European Olympic Boxing Qualifying Tournament was held from 7 – 12 April 2008 in Athens, Greece. During the tournament 193 boxers from 39 countries competed for 23 Olympic qualifying places in 11 different weight categories.

== Qualifying ==
40 teams participated in this tournament:

- Armenia (5)
- Austria (3)
- Azerbaijan (9)
- Bosnia and Herzegovina (5)
- Belarus (8)
- Bulgaria (8)
- Croatia (6)
- Cyprus (5)
- Czech Republic (6)
- Spain (2)
- Estonia (2)
- Finland (5)
- France (6)
- Great Britain (5) (ENG - 4) (SCO - 1)
- Georgia (6)
- Germany (7)
- Greece (8)
- Hungary (7)
- Ireland (9)
- Iceland (1)
- Israel (4)
- Italy (7)
- Latvia (6)
- Lithuania (7)
- Moldova (7)
- Macedonia (1)
- Montenegro (3)
- Netherlands (3)
- Norway (1)
- Poland (8)
- Romania (8)
- Russia (1)
- Serbia (4)
- Slovakia (3)
- Slovenia (1)
- Sweden (6)
- Turkey (8)
- Ukraine (2)

Number in ( ) is total boxer in each country

== Competition System ==
The competition system of the 2nd AIBA European Olympic Boxing Qualifying Tournament is the knockout round system. Each boxer fights one match per round.

The first two places in each weight provided direct qualification to the 2008 Olympics with and additional qualification place for 3rd place provided in the 54 kg, 69 kg and 75 kg classes after a box off between the two losing semi finalists.

Vittorio Parrinello (ITA, 54 kg), Andrey Balanov (RUS, 69 kg), and Georgios Gazis (GRE, 75 kg) booked the last available tickets to the Beijing Olympics, by winning their bronze contests in the last day of the 2nd AIBA Olympic Qualifying Tournament.

== Medal summary ==
Event	Gold	Silver	Bronze
Light flyweight	(Hungary) Pál Bedák	(Spain) Jose Kelvin de la Nieve Linares	(Turkey) Ferhat Pehlivan (North Macedonia) Mumin Veli
Flyweight	(Turkey) Memis Fulas	(France) Jérôme Thomas	(Armenia) Derenik Chizlaryan (Belgium) Bato-Munko Vankeyeu
Bantamweight	(France) Ali Hallab	(Belarus) Khavazhy Khatsyhau	(Italy) Vittorio Parrinello (Slovakia) Rudolf Dydi
Featherweight	(Italy) Alessio di Savino	(Georgia (country)) Nikoloz Izoria	(England) Stephen Smith (Sweden) Bashir Hassan
Lightweight	(France) Daouda Sow	(Romania) Georgian Popescu	(Georgia (country)) Kobar Pkhakadze (Poland) Krzysztof Szot
Light Welterweight	(Republic of Ireland) John Joe Joyce	(Lithuania) Egidijus Kavaliauskas	(Germany) Harun Sipahi (Croatia) Boris Katalinic
Welterweight	(France) Jaoid Chiguer	(Georgia (country)) Kakhaber Zhvania	(Russia) Andrey Balanov (Armenia) Samuel Matevosyan
Middleweight	(Republic of Ireland) Darren Sutherland	(France) Jean-Michel Raymond	(Greece) Georgios Gazis (Moldova) Victor Cotiujanschii
Light Heavyweight	(Republic of Ireland) Kenneth Egan	(Sweden) Kennedy Katende	(Germany) Gottlieb Weiss (Greece) Anastasios Berdesis
Heavyweight	(Montenegro) Milorad Gajovic	(Greece) Ilias Pavlidis	(Montenegro) Elchin Alizada (Romania) Petrisor Gananau
Super Heavyweight	(Lithuania) Jaroslav Jaksto	(England) Daniel Price	(Romania) Cristian Ciocan (Iceland) Yosef Abed Elghani

== Medal table ==
Based on AIBA weightings which takes into consideration the number of bouts fought and number of competitors per team.

Rank	Nation	Gold	Silver	Bronze	Total
1	France	3	2	0	5
2	Ireland	3	0	0	3
3	Lithuania	1	1	0	2
4	Italy	1	0	1	2
4	Montenegro	1	0	1	2
4	Turkey	1	0	1	2
7	Hungary	1	0	0	1
8	Georgia	0	2	1	3
9	Greece	0	1	2	3
9	Romania	0	1	2	3
11	Great Britain	0	1	1	2
11	Sweden	0	1	1	2
13	Belarus	0	1	0	1
13	Spain	0	1	0	1
15	Armenia	0	0	2	2
15	Germany	0	0	2	2
17	Belgium	0	0	1	1
17	Croatia	0	0	1	1
17	Iceland	0	0	1	1
17	Macedonia	0	0	1	1
17	Moldova	0	0	1	1
17	Poland	0	0	1	1
17	Russia	0	0	1	1
17	Slovakia	0	0	1	1
Totals (24 entries)		11	11	22	44

== Key to AIBA decisions ==
KO	DSQ	BDSQ	JURY	RSC	RSCH	RSCI	RSCOS	NC	WO	RET	R
Knockout	Disqualified	Both disqualified	Result determined by jury votes	Referee stop contest	Referee stop contest by head blow	Referee stop contest by injured	Referee stop contest outscored	No contest	Walkover	Retired	Round

== See also ==
- 1st AIBA European 2008 Olympic Qualifying Tournament
