= Nathan Cleverly vs. Robin Krasniqi =

Boxing match

Rule Britannia
- Date: 20 April 2013
- Venue: Wembley Arena, Wembley, London, UK
- Title(s) on the line: WBO light heavyweight title

Tale of the tape
Boxer	Nathan Cleverly	Robin Krasniqi
Nickname	"Clev"	
Hometown	Cefn Fforest, Gwent, UK	Munich, Bavaria, Germany
Pre-fight record	25–0 (12 KO)	39–2 (15 KO)
Age	26 years, 2 months	26 years
Height	6 ft 2 in (188 cm)	6 ft 1 in (185 cm)
Weight	174 1/2 lb (79 kg)	173 lb (78 kg)
Style	Orthodox	Orthodox
Recognition	WBO; Light Heavyweight Champion; The Ring; No. 2 Ranked Light Heavyweight; TBRB; No. 5 Ranked Light Heavyweight	WBO; No. 1 Ranked Light-Heavyweight

Result
- Cleverly wins via 12–round unanimous decision (120–108, 119–109, 120–108)

Nathan Cleverly vs. Robin Krasniqi, billed as Rule Britannia, was a professional boxing match contested on 20 April 2013, for the WBO light-heavyweight championship. The bout took place at Wembley Arena, with Cleverly winning by unanimous decision.

== Background ==
On 19 December 2012, it was announced that Cleverly's promoter, Frank Warren, had won the purse bid for the contest and that Cleverly would fight Krasniqi on 16 March 2013, with the location to be either London, Liverpool, or Cardiff. In the lead-up to the fight, Cleverly stated his intention to have a unification bout against WBA champion Beibut Shumenov, or against the winner of the upcoming IBF title match between Tavoris Cloud and Bernard Hopkins.

On 4 March, it was announced that Cleverly had been forced to withdraw from the fight due to a stomach ailment that caused illness during training, and the fight was rescheduled for 20 April on BoxNation.

== Fight details ==
In the opening seconds, Cleverly and Krasniqi traded jabs, with Cleverly initiating with straight right hands. As the round advanced, Cleverly momentarily hurt Krasniqi with a one-two combination that sent him to the ropes. He then landed a flurry of punches, with Krasniqi retaliating with an uppercut. As the second round progressed, Cleverly continued to lead with the jab, maintaining a high work rate and landing eye-catching shots, while Krasniqi attempted to press forward and throw single punches. Krasniqi began the third with a swift combination of his own, prompting a taunt from Cleverly, as both aimed to apply pressure and engage in close exchanges to finish the round strongly. In the fourth round, Cleverly successfully pinned Krasniqi against the ropes, delivering a powerful right hand. Krasniqi evaded the subsequent attack and maneuvered along the ropes on the back foot, as Cleverly stalked forward, rallying late on. In the fifth round, Cleverly maintained close quarters in the fight, delivering hooks to both body and head, while Krasniqi sought counters and retaliated to stop Cleverly's aggression. In the concluding minute of the sixth round, both Cleverly and Krasniqi engaged in a fierce exchange in the centre of the ring. Cleverly began the seventh on the back foot, feinting with his jab and flurrying off the ropes, as Krasniqi advanced, aiming to walk Cleverly down and get into range to deliver powerful shots, landing an overhand right hand to end the round. Cleverly increased his work rate in the eighth, outpacing Krasniqi and landing the cleaner punches that round, showcasing his hand speed. In the ninth round, Cleverly launched an offensive, out-landing Krasniqi and compelling him to yield ground. In the final moments of the tenth round, Cleverly landed several fast and solid punches on Krasniqi, who was backed up against the ropes, as the two traded blows once again just as the bell sounded. Cleverly boxed from a distance in the penultimate round, nullifying Krasniqi's output as he tried to close the gap. In the final round, Krasniqi pressed forward, attempting to maintain the pressure while landing scoring shots, as Cleverly boxed behind the jab, his right eye swelling in the closing moments. All three judges unanimously scored the fight in favour of Cleverly, with scores of 120–108, 119–109 and 120–108.

== Aftermath ==
Following Cleverly's win, in the post-fight interview, Cleverly reflected on his thoughtful and focused approach to boxing. He expressed satisfaction with his performance, acknowledging the challenge posed by Krasniqi. Cleverly emphasised the importance of staying focused throughout the entire 12 rounds, noting that while he felt strong and controlled the fight with his jab, the finish eluded him. Cleverly praised Krasniqi's resilience, highlighting how the challenger dug deep and managed to go the distance. He also mentioned the effectiveness of his left hook to the body, which Krasniqi eventually started blocking more effectively. Cleverly spoke about the need to adapt and create openings, and he credited his ability to switch between long boxing and going for the finish. He candidly discussed areas for improvement, such as keeping his chin down and hands up to avoid wild hooks, and expressed his eagerness to continue learning and improving as he aims to compete at the elite level.

Cleverly was defeated by Sergey Kovalev on 17 August, by stoppage to lose the WBO title.

== Fight card ==
Confirmed bouts:

Weight Class		vs.		Method	Round	Time	Notes
Heavyweight	Derek Chisora	def.	Héctor Alfredo Ávila	TKO	9/10	2:49
Light-heavyweight	Frank Buglioni	def.	Darren McKenna	KO	3/8	1:36
Light-heavyweight	Nathan Cleverly (c)	def.	Robin Krasniqi	UD	12/12		^{Note 1}
Middleweight	Steve O'Meara	def.	Chas Symonds	PTS	6/6
Super-flyweight	Paul Butler	def.	Yaqub Kareem (c)	TKO	5/12	0:24	^{Note 2}
Light-welterweight	Mitchell Smith	def.	Gavin Reid	TKO	1/6	2:46
Lightweight	Liam Walsh (c)	def.	Scott Harrison	UD	12/12		^{Note 3}
Lightweight	Joey Taylor	def.	Sid Razak	PTS	6/6
Preliminary bouts
Super-featherweight	Joe Murray	def.	Dai Davies	PTS	8/8
Light-middleweight	John Thain	def.	Ryan Toms	PTS	8/8
Light-welterweight	Gary Corcoran	def.	Mark McKray	PTS	6/6
Light-heavyweight	Enzo Maccarinelli	def.	Carl Wild	TKO	6/6	2:18
Light-heavyweight	Miles Shinkwin	def.	Mitch Mitchell	PTS	4/4
Light-welterweight	Matty Fagan	def.	Kristian Laight	PTS	4/4

^Note 1 For WBO light-heavyweight title
^Note 2 For Commonwealth super-flyweight title
^Note 3 For WBO European lightweight title

== Broadcasting ==
Country	Broadcasters
Country	Cable/Pay TV
United Kingdom	BoxNation
Hungary	Sport 2
Mexico	Televisa
United States	Epix

Preceded by vs. Shawn Hawk	Nathan Cleverly's bouts 20 April 2013	Succeeded by vs. Sergey Kovalev
Preceded by vs. Max Heyman	Robin Krasniqi's bouts 20 April 2013	Succeeded by vs. Tomas Adamek
