= Kanat Abutalipov =

Kazakh boxer (born 1983)

Personal information
- Full name: Қанат Қалижанұлы Әбутәліпов
- Born: March 22, 1983 (age 43) Barshino, Karaganda, Kazakh SSR, Soviet Union
- Height: 1.56 m (5 ft 1 in)
- Weight: 54 kg (119 lb)

Sport
- Sport: Boxing
- Weight class: Bantamweight

Kanat Kalizhanovich Abutalipov (Kazakh: Қанат Қалижанұлы Әбутәліпов; born March 22, 1983, in Barshino) is a Kazakh boxer who competed at the 2008 Olympics at bantamweight but lost his only fight to eventual silver medallist Yankiel León (3:10) from Cuba.

At the World Championships 2009 he won two bouts and made it to the quarterfinals.

At the 2012 Summer Olympics, he again lost to the eventual bantamweight silver medalist, John Joe Nevin from Ireland, this time in the last 16.
