= Luke Campbell =

English politician and former boxer (born 1987)

Luke Campbell MBE
- Campbell in 2026

Mayor of Hull and East Yorkshire
- Incumbent
- Assumed office 6 May 2025
- Preceded by: Office established
- Majority: 10,981 (8.1%)

Personal details
- Born: 27 September 1987 (age 39) Kingston upon Hull, England
- Party: Reform UK
- Spouse: Lynsey Kraanen (m. 2015)
- Children: 3
- Boxing career
- Nickname: Cool Hand
- Height: 5 ft 9 in (175 cm)
- Weight: Lightweight
- Reach: 71 in (180 cm)
- Stance: Southpaw

Boxing record
- Total fights: 24
- Wins: 20
- Win by KO: 16
- Losses: 4
Medal record
Men's amateur boxing
Representing Great Britain
Olympic Games
Gold medal – first place	2012 London	Bantamweight
Representing England
World Championships
Silver medal – second place	2011 Baku	Bantamweight
European Championships
Gold medal – first place	2008 Liverpool	Bantamweight
EU Championships
Bronze medal – third place	2009 Odense	Bantamweight

Luke Campbell (born 27 September 1987) is a British politician, former professional boxer and Olympic Gold Medallist. A member of Reform UK, he has served as the inaugural strategic authority mayor for Hull and East Yorkshire since 6 May 2025. He competed as a professional boxer from 2013 to 2021, where he was also known by the nickname Cool Hand.

As an amateur, Campbell won a gold medal at the 2008 European Championships, silver at the 2011 World Championships, and gold at the 2012 Olympics, all in the bantamweight division. He was also a contestant on the eighth series of Dancing on Ice in 2013, reaching the final and finishing in third place.

== Boxing career ==
=== Amateur career ===
Senior ABA titles

Campbell competed for St. Paul's Amateur Boxing Club in Hull, winning the English senior ABA bantamweight title in 2007 and retaining in 2008 after beating Gareth Smith 23–1 in the final.

2008 European Championships

He represented England at the 2008 European Amateur Boxing Championships in Liverpool. At the Championships, Campbell defeated Olympic bronze medallist Veaceslav Gojan of Moldova in the quarterfinals and Denis Makarov of Germany in the semi-finals before facing the experienced Detelin Dalakliev of Bulgaria in the final.

After four rounds the Bulgarian levelled the scores in the fight to 5 each after he scored a point in the last two seconds of the fight. The decision then went to countback and Campbell was awarded the title making Campbell the first Englishman to win a European amateur title since 1961.

2010 Four Nations Challenge

Following his successful return, following a year long sabbatical to recover from tendon surgery, to International competition at the WBC Night Of Champions in Cardiff in July, Luke started his 2012 London Olympics preparations by securing gold at the Four Nations Challenge in Sheffield.

On the Saturday Luke, who convincingly won his Featherweight (57 kg) fight by an 11–5 points margin over China's Jun Tan at the WBC Night Of Champions, continued his winning ways by beating Kazakhstan's Shulakov Madi by 6 – 4 in the semi-final of the Four Nations Challenge.

In Sunday's final Luke again faced Jun Tan from China, his adversary the previous week at the WBC Night of Champions. As before Luke dominated the proceedings, this time winning by an increased points margin of 11–3.

2011 World Championships

Campbell qualified for the 2012 Olympic Games after winning a silver medal at the 2011 World Amateur Boxing Championships – Bantamweight in Baku, Azerbaijan.

==== 2012 Summer Olympics ====
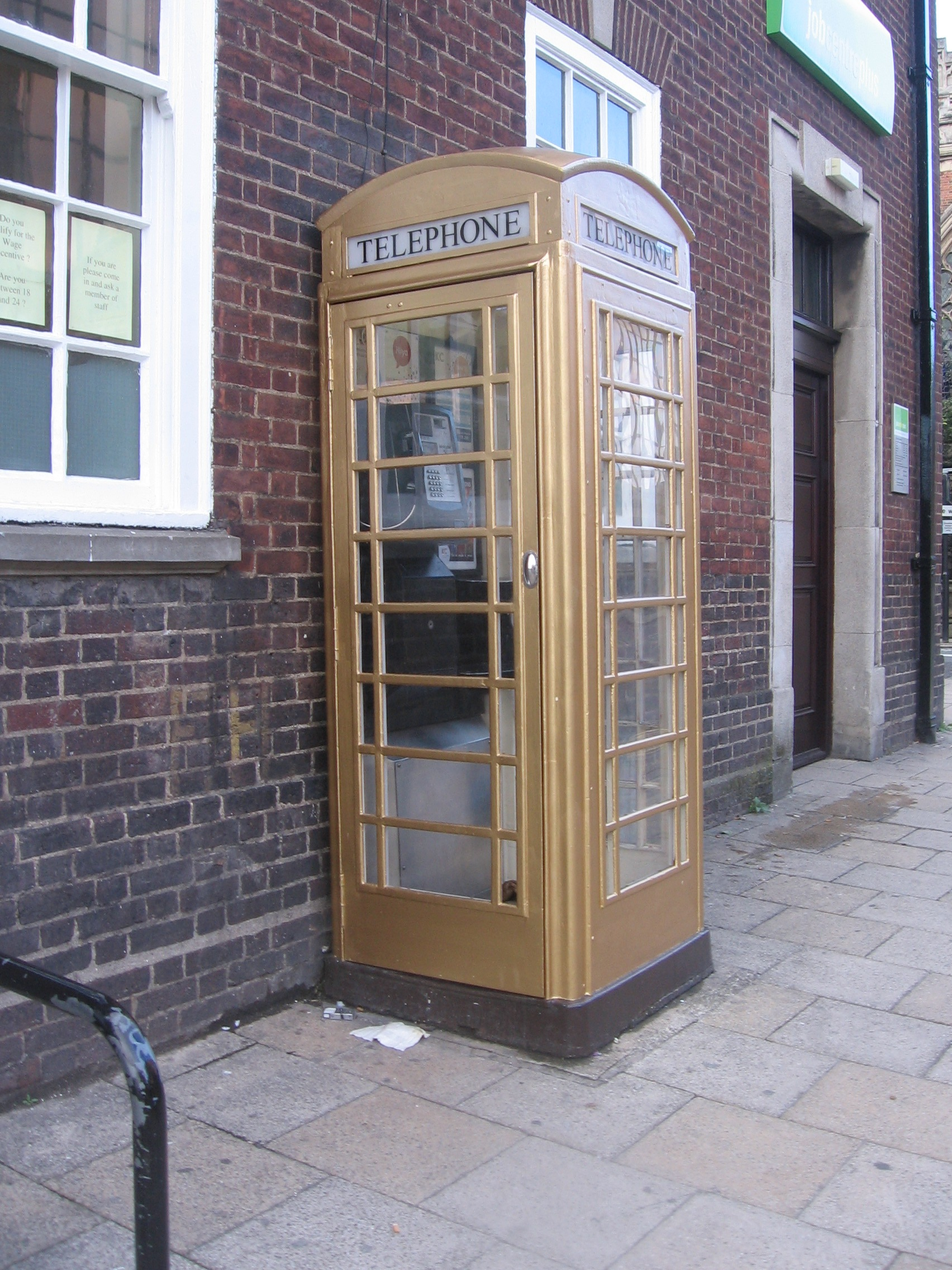
Gold telephone box near St Paul's Boxing Club, Hull commemorating Campbell's gold medal at the 2012 Summer Olympics.

At the 2012 London Olympics, Campbell won gold in the 56 kg Bantamweight division after beating Ireland's John Joe Nevin 14:11. Campbell had earlier beaten Italian, Vittorio Parrinello, by 11:9. In the quarter-finals he met Detelin Dalakliev of Bulgaria in his closest bout of the competition, controversially edging it by a score of 16:15. His next opponent, Satoshi Shimizu from Japan- who had earlier been reinstated in the tournament by AIBA after a successful appeal after a defeat by Magomed Abdulhamidov was beaten by 20:11. Campbell beat Nevin in the final bout, and dropped the Irishman at the start of the third round, thus becoming the first bantamweight boxer to win Olympic gold for Great Britain since Henry Thomas in 1908.

A first class postage stamp, depicting Campbell, was issued by Royal Mail and a post box in Hessle Road, Hull was painted gold to commemorate his gold medal win. Local telephone network provider, KC, have also commemorated the win by painting one of their telephone boxes, near to St Paul's Boxing Club, gold.

Campbell was appointed Member of the Order of the British Empire (MBE) in the 2013 New Year Honours for services to boxing. In 2013, Campbell appeared as a contestant on the eighth series of the ITV skating competition Dancing on Ice. He was paired with professional Jenna Smith and the pair reached the final, finishing in third place.

Campbell ended his amateur career with a record of 153–24.

=== Early professional career ===
Campbell's first professional fight took place on 13 July 2013 at Craven Park in his home city of Hull. His opponent was Andy Harris who he beat in the first round. Campbell continued his undefeated start to his career with a fifth-round stoppage of Lee Connelly in Hull on 2 November 2013. In his fifth professional bout Campbell carried on his undefeated record and became the first person to stop Scott Moises.

In April 2014, Campbell announced that he would be taking a break from boxing, pulling out of his next scheduled bout, following his father being diagnosed with cancer.

Despite announcing he would be taking a break from boxing, Campbell fought a further four times in 2014. A points win over Craig Woodruff, a knockout win of Steve Trumble, a technical knockout (TKO) victory over Krzysztof Szot and another TKO win over Daniel Eduardo Brizuela. In March 2015, Campbell faced off against 24 year old Nicaraguan Levis Morales (11–1–1, 4 KOs) at the Ice Arena in Hull. Campbell knocked down Morales in round two and three, before the referee Howard John Foster stopped the fight resulting in a TKO victory for Campbell.

On 1 August, Campbell claimed the vacant WBC International lightweight title by defeating fellow Hullensian Tommy Coyle (21–2, 10 KOs) via ten-round TKO at the KC Lightstream Stadium. This was also a WBC lightweight eliminator. Coyle was knocked down once in round two following a left to the body and three times in round twelve before the referee waved off the fight. Only four months later in December, Campbell lost the title and mandatory status in a split decision loss to French boxer Yvan Mendy (32–4–1, 16 KOs) at The O2 Arena in London on the undercard of Anthony Joshua vs. Dillian Whyte. Campbell was floored for the first time in his professional career in a ragged defensive display as Mendy received a split decision with scores of 115–112, 115–113, while the third judge scored it 115–113 for Campbell.

After a three-month lay off, Campbell started a comeback trail in March on the undercard of Brook-Bizier at the Sheffield Arena in Sheffield, fighting British boxer Gary Sykes (28–4, 6 KOs) for the vacant Commonwealth lightweight title. Campbell made a winning return to the ring in spectacular fashion only needing two rounds to finish Sykes off in his first fight since losing his unbeaten professional record. A left hook that landed hard on the top of Sykes' head had him struggling before a straight right put him down. Although Sykes beat the count, Campbell was all over him. It was the left-hook that opened the door again, this time in the midsection, followed by a right to the temple. Referee Steve Gray moved swiftly in as Sykes' corner was throwing their towel to halt the fight.

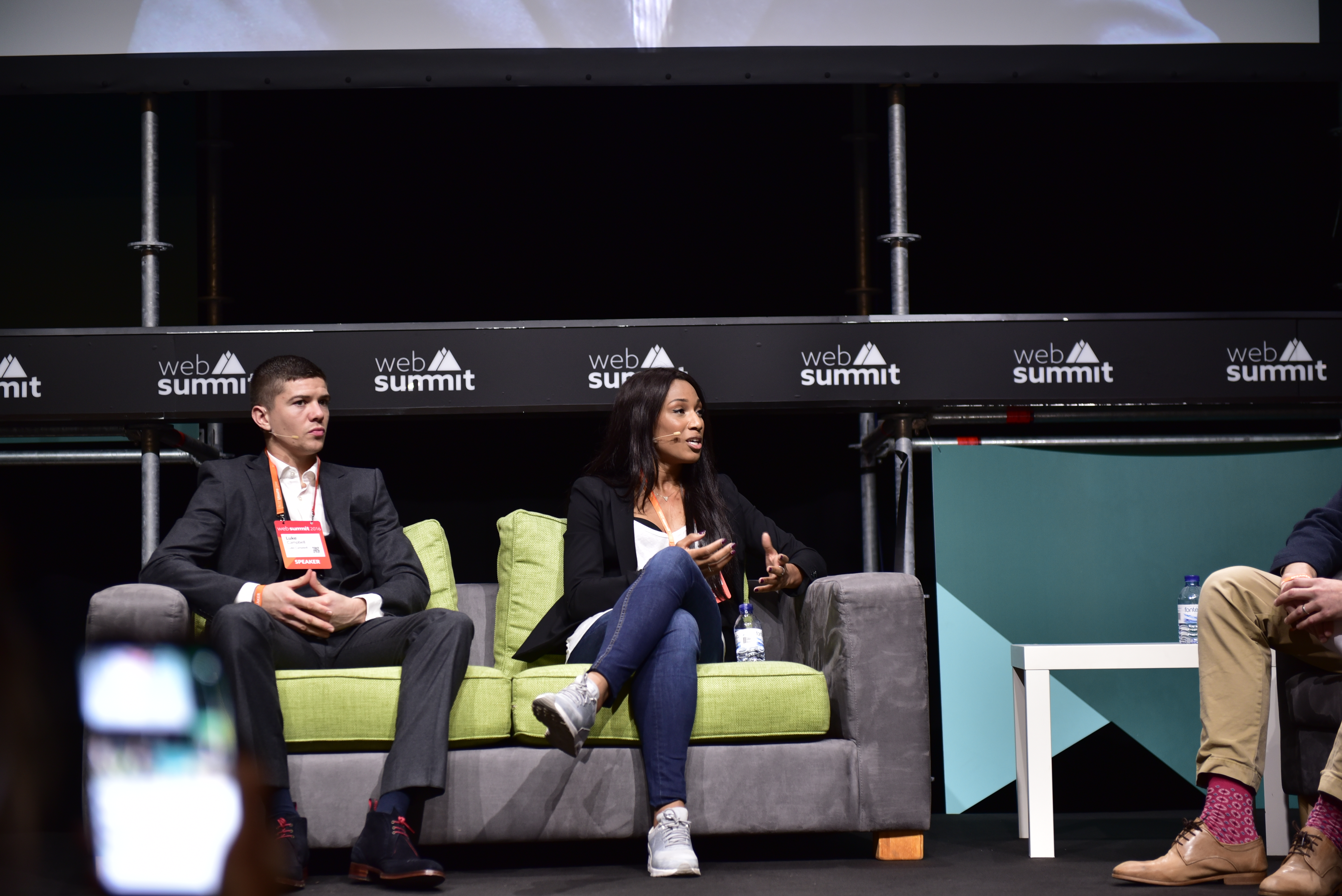
Campbell and Patrícia Mamona at Web Summit 2016

Promoter Eddie Hearn revealed Campbell was next due to fight on 30 July 2016 at the First Direct Arena in Leeds for the vacant WBC Silver lightweight title against 30 year old former IBF junior-lightweight champion Argenis Mendez (23–4–1, 12 KOs). Although being floored by a sharp right hand in the second round, Campbell proved to be too quick and dominated the remainder of the fight to claim the vacant WBC Silver lightweight title. From the third round, it became a comfortable fight for Campbell who moved his opponent around the ring and caught him with a succession of punches. The scorecards were all in favour of Campbell 116–111, 117–110, 115–112, who stated he would now like to land a world title shot.

=== Rise up the ranks ===
==== Campbell vs. Mathews, Lopez ====
Campbell fought former British and Commonwealth lightweight champion and former world title challenger Derry Mathews (38–10, 20 KOs) on the undercard of the world cruiserweight title fight between Tony Bellew and BJ Flores at the Echo Arena on 15 October, live on Sky Sports. This was the first defence of the WBC Silver lightweight title in a scheduled twelve round bout. The fight started off as a brawl, however Campbell proved to be too quick as he retained his titles and kept his future world title shot alive after stopping Mathews in round four. Mathews was dropped following a couple of left hooks to his body. In the post fight interview, Campbell claimed, despite winning via stoppage, his game plan was 'to outbox Mathews for a points win'.

On 3 January 2017, it was announced that Campbell would defend his WBC Silver title against Jairo Lopez (21–6, 14 KOs) at the Ice Arena in Hull on 25 February. The title defence would be part of a triple header, also including fellow Hullensian Tommy Coyle and Gavin McDonnell challenging for the vacant WBC super-bantamweight title. Campbell won the fight in round two after a well timed uppercut floored Lopez. Referee Ian-John Lewis halted the fight. Lopez was also dropped in round one just before the bell rang. Campbell retained his WBC Silver lightweight title. After the fight, Campbell and promoter Eddie Hearn both said the fight they were chasing next is a rematch with French boxer Yvan Mendy, to avenge his sole loss. "Mendy has done the worst thing possible in beating me", Campbell said after the fight.

==== Campbell vs. Pérez ====
On 10 April 2017, Eurosport and Sky Sports announced that Campbell would be involved in a WBA lightweight title eliminator against former WBA interim lightweight titlist Darleys Pérez (33–2–2, 21 KOs) on the Anthony Joshua vs. Wladimir Klitschko undercard at the Wembley Stadium on 29 April 2017. The winner would be in the number one position to challenge champion Jorge Linares. Pérez weighed over the limit at 136.3 pounds, so had he won the bout, he would not have been eligible for the mandatory spot. Campbell racked up the win via a ninth-round stoppage win, which was due to injury. It was said that Pérez hurt his left arm after a throwing a left hook. He signaled to the referee that he could not continue and the fight was stopped at 1 minute 28 seconds into the round. Although Pérez started the fight well, enough to win the first three rounds, he physically looked gassed by the later rounds where Campbell took over. With the win, Campbell was made the new mandatory challenger to WBA champion Jorge Linares. Eddie Hearn said he would speak to Golden Boy Promotions to push things forward for the fight to be made.

=== World title challenge ===
==== Campbell vs. Linares ====
Golden Boy Promotions matchmaker, Robert Diaz, announced that WBA and The Ring lightweight champion Jorge Linares (42–3, 27 KOs) would next fight on 23 September 2017 and ruled out Campbell as his opponent. The plan being to have Campbell to fight on the undercard. If both fighters win their respected bouts, they would meet in the future. On 21 July 2017 the WBA ordered Linares to make a mandatory defence against Campbell. As per WBA rules, a titleholder must fight a mandatory within nine months, this time would expire on 23 July, having won the title from Crolla in September 2016. Both sides were given 30 days to come to an agreement for the fight. On 27 July, a deal was reached for Linares and Campbell to fight at The Forum in Inglewood, California, on 23 September 2017. The bout will be shown live on Sky Sports in the UK and on HBO: Boxing After Dark in the US. In an interview, Linares said, "I am excited to make my return to the US and to headline a HBO show for the first time. I know Campbell is a tough [...] I am confident that I will emerge victorious on September 23rd." This fight would mark the second time Campbell fights professionally in California. In front of 4,125, Linares won his twelfth straight fight, retaining his WBA world title after twelve rounds against Campbell. One judge scored the fight 115–113 for Campbell, the remaining two had it 115–112 and 114–113 in favour of Linares, giving him the split decision win. ESPN.com also scored the fight 115–112 for Linares. Linares dropped Campbell with a straight right hand to the head in round two. Between rounds five and nine, Campbell took control of the fight. Linares began winning the championship rounds. Had Campbell not been knocked down early in the fight, the verdict would have been a split draw.

Campbell believed he won the fight, speaking to Max Kellerman he said, "No one can ever doubt my heart. Yeah, I got off to a rocky start. He hit me with a nice, clean shot in the second round, caught me on the eye, cut it. I wasn’t dazed. From there, I had double vision in one eye for the rest of the fight. But from then, I out-classed him. I thought I won the fight. He’s a great champion, but I thought I out-classed him. I didn't think he was landing any shots whatsoever, and I was catching him with all the clean shots." Linares praised Campbell for his efforts, "He was a tough opponent. Many people said he was very easy, but it’s not for no reason he’s an Olympic champion. I fought very well all the way to the twelfth round. And I think in the fifth round, I started to box him a little bit because I didn't wanna get hurt." CompuBox stats showed Linares landed 140 of 414 thrown (34%), while Campbell was credited to landing 141 of his 524 thrown (27%). After the fight, promoter Eddie Hearn stated that Campbell could fight the winner of Crolla vs. Burns or another possible opponent would be WBO lightweight champion Terry Flanagan. A day after the fight, Campell revealed that his father had died of cancer two weeks before the fight. Campbell was in the US at his training camp when his father died at home, with family members. The fight drew an average of 687,000 viewers and peaked at 726,000 viewers on HBO.

=== Regaining composure ===
On 3 May 2018, it was announced by Matchroom that Campbell would appear on the Bellew-Haye II card the next day at the O2 Arena in London in a six-round fight. Campbell fought and defeated Troy James (20–5–1, 5 KOs). In round two, Campbell hit James with a left uppercut followed by a right hand that dropped him. James quickly recovered and survived the remainder of the round. In round four, Campbell dropped James with a hard shot, again James showed heart in getting up off the canvas. In the following round, Campbell started to unload and landed a barrage of unanswered punches before the referee stepped in to stop the fight.

On 31 July, Campbell announced Shane McGuigan as his new trainer. Speaking on the partnership, Campbell said, "I'm incredibly excited to be teaming up with Shane. I've always heard good things about him within boxing but having trained under him for a few weeks now I can vouch for just how good he is. We've already struck up a great relationship and I have no doubt he is going to help take me to the next level. I want to become a world champion and Shane has a proven track record of achieving that with his fighters. It's a thriving gym with a great atmosphere and world class fighters, and that's where I want to be." In his statement, McGuigan said he would help Campbell become an elite as well as win a world title.

==== Campbell vs. Mendy II ====
On 6 August, Sky Sports announced the rematch between Campbell and 33 year old French boxer Yvan Mendy (40–4–1, 19 KOs) was confirmed to take place on the Anthony Joshua vs. Alexander Povetkin undercard at the Wembley Stadium in London on 22 September. Since defeating Campbell in their first fight in December 2015, Mendy had gone on to win seven fights in a row and picked up a #1 ranking with WBC at lightweight. Hearn called the bout a 'true 50–50 fight' as both boxers had improved since their first meeting. Campbell won the bout on points to avenge the earlier defeat. After twelve rounds the scorecards read 119–109, 118–111 and 116–112 in favour or Campbell. Mendy had his moments in the earlier rounds, but once Campbell adjusted, he was able to box and move to pound out a decision victory in what was a WBC lightweight title eliminator.

==== Campbell vs. Yung ====
On 15 March 2019, Campbell, who was now the mandatory challenger to Mikey Garcia's WBC lightweight title, travelled to Philadelphia, Pennsylvania, to take on Adrian Yung. Both men had never been stopped prior to the bout, but that changed when Campbell landed a left hook in the fifth round followed by a flurry of punches which forced the referee to halt the fight, making Campbell the winner by fifth-round technical knockout.

=== Second world title challenge ===
==== Campbell vs. Lomachenko ====
On 31 August 2019, Campbell challenged the top pound-for-pound fighter and three-division world champion, Vasiliy Lomachenko, for the WBA (Super), WBO, The Ring, and vacant WBC lightweight titles at The O2 Arena in London.

Prior to the fight on 22 August 2019, Sky Sports released "The Gloves are Off: The Debate (Lomachenko vs. Campbell)" segment, hosted by former cruiserweight world champion Johnny Nelson, with retired, former world champions Tony Bellew, Carl Froch, David Haye and Paulie Malignaggi giving their pre-fight analysis as part of the lead up to the fight. Although all parties agreed Campbell will be the underdog going into the fight, with the odds being stacked in Lomachenko's favour, all praised Campbell's skill and amateur pedigree, with Malignaggi insisting Campbell is "one of the better fighters in the world to have not won a world championship."

On the night of the fight, Lomachenko put on a dominant display, dropping Campbell in the eleventh round and winning a wide unanimous decision with scores of 119–108, 119–108, 118–109.

=== Final fight and retirement ===
==== Campbell vs. García ====
On 2 January 2021, Campbell faced undefeated Ryan García for the vacant WBC interim lightweight title in what would ultimately be his final professional fight. Despite entering as the pre-fight betting underdog, Campbell dropped his opponent in the second round with a left hand, from which García recovered. García returned the favour in the seventh round, by dropping Campbell with a left hook to the body. Campbell, however, was not able to beat the count and suffered the first and only stoppage loss of his career.

On 30 July 2021, Campbell announced his retirement from boxing. He released a statement on Twitter, saying, "Every fight, right the way from my debut on 13th June 2013, up to my last on 2nd January 2021, the cheers and messages of encouragement have always been monumental. Throughout my career I've tried to test myself against the very best in the industry and never shied away from anyone. I'm so grateful this hasn't gone unnoticed from supporters and I appreciate you all."

== Professional boxing record ==
24 fights	20 wins	4 losses
By knockout	16	1
By decision	4	3

No.	Result	Record	Opponent	Type	Round, time	Date	Location	Notes
24	Loss	20–4	Ryan Garcia	TKO	7 (12), 1:58	2 Jan 2021	American Airlines Center, Dallas, Texas, US	For vacant WBC interim lightweight title
23	Loss	20–3	Vasiliy Lomachenko	UD	12	31 Aug 2019	The O2 Arena, London, England	For WBA (Super), WBO, The Ring, and vacant WBC lightweight titles
22	Win	20–2	Adrian Yung	TKO	5 (10), 1:37	15 Mar 2019	Liacouras Center, Philadelphia, Pennsylvania, US	
21	Win	19–2	Yvan Mendy	UD	12	22 Sep 2018	Wembley Stadium, London, England	
20	Win	18–2	Troy James	TKO	5 (6), 2:18	5 May 2018	The O2 Arena, London, England	
19	Loss	17–2	Jorge Linares	SD	12	23 Sep 2017	The Forum, Inglewood, California, US	For WBA, WBC Diamond and The Ring lightweight titles
18	Win	17–1	Darleys Pérez	TKO	9 (12), 1:28	29 Apr 2017	Wembley Stadium, London, England	
17	Win	16–1	Jairo Lopez	TKO	2 (12), 1:19	25 Feb 2017	Hull Arena, Hull, England	Retained WBC Silver lightweight title
16	Win	15–1	Derry Mathews	KO	4 (12), 2:46	15 Oct 2016	Echo Arena, Liverpool, England	Retained WBC Silver and Commonwealth lightweight titles
15	Win	14–1	Argenis Mendez	UD	12	30 Jul 2016	First Direct Arena, Leeds, England	Won vacant WBC Silver lightweight title
14	Win	13–1	Gary Sykes	TKO	2 (12), 2:58	26 Mar 2016	Sheffield Arena, Sheffield, England	Won vacant Commonwealth lightweight title
13	Loss	12–1	Yvan Mendy	SD	12	12 Dec 2015	The O2 Arena, London, England	Lost WBC International lightweight title
12	Win	12–0	Tommy Coyle	TKO	10 (12), 1:41	1 Aug 2015	Craven Park, Hull, England	Won vacant WBC International lightweight title
11	Win	11–0	Aboubeker Bechelaghem	TKO	3 (8), 1:03	9 May 2015	Barclaycard Arena, Birmingham, England	
10	Win	10–0	Levis Morales	TKO	3 (8), 0:55	7 Mar 2015	Hull Arena, Hull, England	
9	Win	9–0	Daniel Brizuela	TKO	5 (10), 2:34	25 Oct 2014	Hull Arena, Hull, England	
8	Win	8–0	Krzysztof Szot	TKO	7 (8), 2:09	20 Sep 2014	The SSE Arena Wembley, London, England	
7	Win	7–0	Steve Trumble	KO	2 (6), 1:56	16 Aug 2014	StubHub Center, Carson, California, US	
6	Win	6–0	Craig Woodruff	UD	6	12 Jul 2014	Echo Arena, Liverpool, England	
5	Win	5–0	Scott Moises	TKO	8 (8), 1:38	22 Feb 2014	Hull Arena, Hull, England	
4	Win	4–0	Chuck Jones	UD	4	23 Nov 2013	Manchester Arena, Manchester, England	
3	Win	3–0	Lee Connelly	TKO	5 (6), 2:00	2 Nov 2013	Hull Arena, Hull, England	
2	Win	2–0	Neil Hepper	KO	1 (6), 1:59	5 Oct 2013	The O2 Arena, London, England	
1	Win	1–0	Andy Harris	TKO	1 (6), 1:28	13 Jul 2013	Craven Park, Hull, England	

== Political career ==
=== Mayor of Hull and East Yorkshire ===
==== Mayoral campaign ====
On 27 February 2025, Campbell was announced as the Reform UK candidate in the 2025 Hull and East Yorkshire mayoral election, stating that he wanted to "give back" to his home city of Hull. He had no prior political experience and said he never voted in an election before, which drew criticism from observers. Explaining his decision to stand, Campbell said he came up with the idea after joking about it with friends, and was then selected by Reform UK "last minute" after meeting its leader Nigel Farage at the party's head office in London. He claimed that he "[did not] care for politics" and was only running as mayor to improve his home region, but said did he did not stand as an independent or for another party because he "would vote Reform anyway so why not", adding that he had been "following Nigel for a while and everything he says seems common sense to me".

In his mayoral campaign, Campbell emphasised his lack of political experience to present himself as a political outsider, stating that he viewed it as a strength and was standing "because our current political parties have failed us". He said he wanted to emulate the success of the presidential campaign of Donald Trump in the United States by taking advantage of voter apathy in the region and said "we need to make Britain great again". Campbell did not campaign on many policies, admitting that he was "not in the know yet" and would learn more about the region's political issues once he was elected as mayor, but said his priorities were to cut "council waste" and "demand" more regional investment from the government. He also pledged to nationalise the "broken" bus services of Hull and East Yorkshire, in line with other mayoral authorities in the North of England. He was initially supportive of investment into renewable energy and net-zero emissions, but soon changed his stance to reflect the more sceptical view of Reform UK, stating at a debate with the other mayoral candidates in April 2025 that he was "half and half" and supported investment if it supported the local economy, while adding that he opposed solar farms and viewed net-zero as unachievable.

==== Mayoralty ====
On 2 May 2025, Campbell was declared the winner of the mayoral election, with 48,491 votes (35.8%) on a majority of 10,981 votes (8.1%) over the 37,510 (27.7%) won by the runner-up Mike Ross of the Liberal Democrats. He took office as the inaugural mayor of Hull and East Yorkshire on 6 May and also became one of Reform's two first elected mayors alongside Andrea Jenkyns, who was elected concurrently as the inaugural mayor of Greater Lincolnshire. In his victory speech, he thanked his voters and supporters and said he was "humbled and honoured" to serve as mayor, while also pledging to earn the "trust and respect" of his critics and those who did not vote for him and asking them to "give me a chance". His election was welcomed by the three local Labour members of Parliament (MPs), Karl Turner, Diana Johnson and Emma Hardy, who pledged to work across party lines with Campbell to secure more investment into Hull and East Yorkshire, while Ross said the Liberal Democrats would hold Campbell to account as mayor.

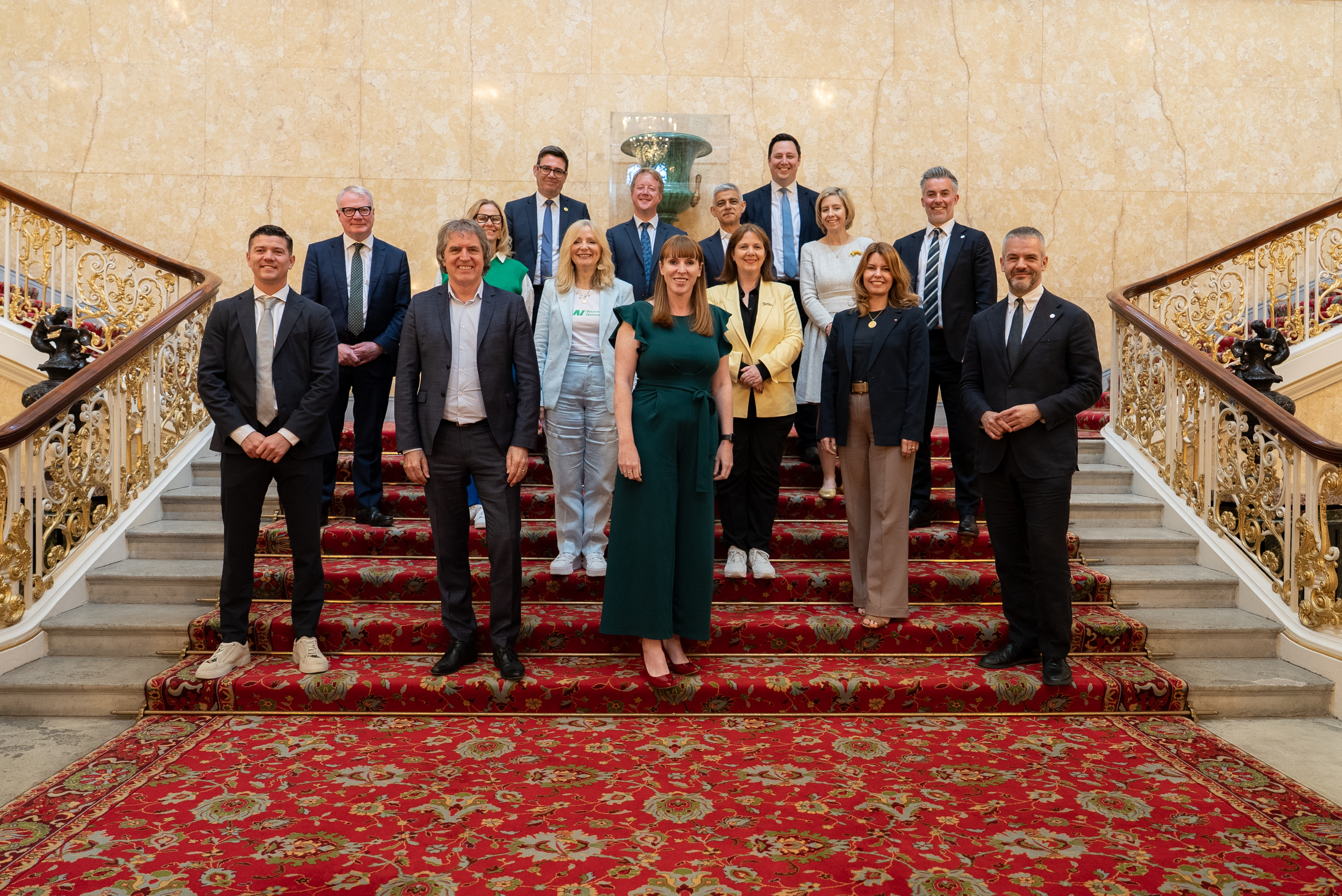
Campbell (first left) attends a meeting of the Mayoral Council for England in May 2025, two weeks after his election as mayor of Hull and East Yorkshire

In the weeks following his election as mayor, Campbell attended a meeting of the Mayoral Council for England, where it was also announced that he had joined the White Rose Partnership of mayors in Yorkshire. He also broke ranks with the leadership of Reform UK to co-found The Great North, a cross-party partnership of elected mayors in Northern England focussing on economic investment and green energy investment, despite Reform UK's opposition to green energy, describing it as a "fantastic opportunity" for Hull and East Yorkshire to work with the rest of the North "on transport and other major infrastructure projects". However, in June 2025, Campbell announced his departure from the White Rose Partnership, stating that he disagreed with the other mayors, all from the Labour Party, on net-zero targets. Campbell said he supported investment into green energy and clean air but could not support net-zero targets, stating that they caused high energy bills.

In March 2026, Campbell was criticised by the local press for failing to attend the two most recent meetings of the Mayoral Council for England.

== Personal life ==
Campbell was born in Hull and supports local football team Hull City. He has three sons with his wife Lynsey Kraanen, a model, whom he married in 2015. Campbell has a notable boxing heritage, with his grandfather having been an Irish boxing champion. Many of Campbell's relatives still live in Ireland.

On 17 October 2026, The Observer reported Campbell was under police investigation for an alleged cyberflashing incident against a female member of staff at his Mayoral offices in Hull. It is alleged Campbell showed four "naked and sexualised images" with the intention of degrading and embarrassing the senior officer in front of male colleagues.

== See also ==
- 2012 Summer Olympics and Paralympics gold post boxes

Sporting positions
Regional boxing titles
Vacant Title last held by Dejan Zlaticanin	WBC International lightweight champion 1 August 2015 – 12 December 2015	Succeeded by Yvan Mendy
Vacant Title last held by Richard Commey	Commonwealth lightweight champion 26 March 2016 – April 2017; Vacated	Vacant Title next held by Sean Dodd
Vacant Title last held by Emiliano Marsili	WBC Silver lightweight champion 30 July 2016 – June 2017; Vacated	Vacant Title next held by Yvan Mendy
