= Liam Walsh (boxer) =

English boxer (born 1986)

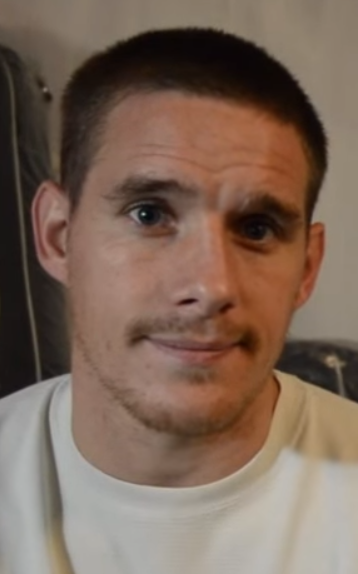
- Walsh in 2015

Personal information
- Nickname: Destiny
- Born: 18 May 1986 (age 40) Rochdale, Greater Manchester, England
- Height: 5 ft 7 1/2 in (171 cm)
- Weight: Super-featherweight; Lightweight

Boxing career
- Reach: 66 in (168 cm)
- Stance: Southpaw

Boxing record
- Total fights: 24
- Wins: 23
- Win by KO: 15
- Losses: 1

Liam Walsh (born 18 May 1986) is an English former professional boxer. He challenged for the IBF super-featherweight title in 2017. Walsh is a former Commonwealth and British super-featherweight champion and had two separate reigns as WBO European lightweight title holder.

== Professional career ==
Walsh made his professional boxing debut on 2 February 2008 alongside his twin brother, Ryan and their elder brother, Michael. Boxing on the same bill as Olympic silver medalist Amir Khan at London's Excel Arena, all three brothers scored winning debuts.

On 23 October 2010, he headlined a bill for the first time at York Hall in Bethnal Green with the vacant Commonwealth super-featherweight title at stake. Walsh defeated his co-challenger for the belt, Maxwell Awuku, by unanimous decision.

He made his first defence of the title on 20 March 2010, scoring a ninth round technical knockout win over John Kays at Robin Park Centre in Wigan.

The second defence of his title came on 30 September 2011, with Walsh meeting former British champion Paul Appleby at York Hall. Despite winning when his opponent retired at the end of the 10th round, Walsh had been knocked down in the seventh round and said afterwards that it was "definitely the hardest fight I've been in."

Moving up a weight division, he won the vacant WBO European lightweight title by stopping Domenico Urbano in the eighth round at the Boleyn Ground in London on 14 July 2012.

Walsh successfully defended the title with a unanimous decision win over Scott Harrison at Wembley Arena on 20 April 2013.

He was scheduled to get his first shot at a world title by challenging WBO lightweight champion Ricky Burns on 15 December 2012, but had to withdraw from the fight due to injuries from being involved in a car crash.

Walsh won the British super-featherweight title against Gary Sykes on 29 November 2024. He dropped Sykes in the first round and went on to dominate the fight and won a unanimous decision with judges scores of 119–108, 118–111 and 118–109.

He defended his British and Commonwealth super-featherweight titles on 28 February 2015 against Joe Murray at The O2 Arena in London, winning by fifth round technical knockout, and again on 30 April 2026 with an eighth round stoppage of Troy James at the Copper Box Arena in London.

On 8 October 2016, Walsh fought undefeated Russian Andrey Kimov as a final IBF eliminator for their version of the super featherweight title. Walsh switched his stance effortlessly throughout the fight and was moving well. In a well-rounded, dominant win, Walsh managed to get the nod via unanimous decision.

In his next fight, Walsh challenged Gervonta Davis for his IBF super-featherweight title. Davis started off with a sharp jab and controlled most of the action in the opening round. The second round was closer, but Davis still had the edge. In the third round, Davis managed to catch Walsh with a big shot, which wobbled the latter, opening the way for Davis so finish the fight with a flurry of big shots. Walsh got dropped, and despite beating the count, was not able to recover and another barrage of shots from Davis forced the referee to stop the fight.

On 9 November 2019, Walsh became a two-time WBO European lightweight champion when he defeated Maxi Hughes by unanimous decision to win the vacant title at York Hall.

He was scheduled to face Paul Hyland Jr for the vacant British lightweight title at the University of Bolton Stadium on 19 March 2021, but withdrew after failing to recover from COVID-19 in time.

== Professional boxing record ==
24 fights	23 wins	1 loss
By knockout	15	1
By decision	8	0

No.	Result	Record	Opponent	Type	Round, time	Date	Location	Notes
24	Win	23–1	Maxi Hughes	UD	10	9 Nov 2019	York Hall, London, England	Won vacant WBO European lightweight title
23	Win	22–1	Reynaldo Cajina	KO	3 (8), 1:18	11 May 2019	Brentwood Centre, Brentwood, England	
22	Loss	21–1	Gervonta Davis	TKO	3 (12), 2:11	20 May 2017	Copper Box Arena, London, England	For IBF super-featherweight title
21	Win	21–0	Andrey Klimov	UD	12	8 Oct 2016	Harrow Leisure Centre, London, England	
20	Win	20–0	Troy James	TKO	8 (12), 1:20	30 Apr 2016	Copper Box Arena, London, England	Retained British and Commonwealth super-featherweight titles
19	Win	19–0	Isaias Santos Sampaio	KO	6 (12), 1:26	11 Jul 2015	Manchester Velodrome, Manchester, England	Won WBO Inter-Continental lightweight title
18	Win	18–0	Joe Murray	TKO	5 (12), 1:12	28 Feb 2015	The O2 Arena, London, England	Retained British and Commonwealth super-featherweight titles
17	Win	17–0	Gary Sykes	UD	12	29 Nov 2014	ExCeL, London, England	Retained Commonwealth super featherweight title; Won British super-featherweight title
16	Win	16–0	Kevin Hooper	KO	4 (10), 3:05	26 Jul 2014	Phones 4u Arena, Manchester, England	
15	Win	15–0	Joe Murray	MD	12	21 Sep 2013	Copper Box Arena, London, England	Retained Commonwealth super-featherweight title
14	Win	14–0	Scott Harrison	UD	10	20 Apr 2013	Wembley Arena, London, England	Retained WBO European lightweight title
13	Win	13–0	Domenico Urbano	TKO	8 (12), 2:10	14 Jul 2012	Boleyn Ground, London, England	Won vacant WBO European lightweight title
12	Win	12–0	Paul Appleby	RTD	10 (12), 3:00	30 Sep 2011	York Hall, London, England	Retained Commonwealth super-featherweight title
11	Win	11–0	Jon Kays	KO	10 (12), 1:05	19 Mar 2011	Robin Park Centre, Wigan, England	Retained Commonwealth super-featherweight title
10	Win	10–0	Maxwell Awuku	UD	12	23 Oct 2010	York Hall, London, England	Won vacant Commonwealth super-featherweight title
9	Win	9–0	Sebastien Cornu	PTS	6	24 Sep 2010	Grosvenor House Hotel, London, England	
8	Win	8–0	Ibrar Riyaz	TKO	1 (6), 1:59	15 May 2010	Boleyn Ground, London, England	
7	Win	7–0	Sid Razak	TKO	4 (6), 2:02	13 Feb 2010	Wembley Arena, London, England	
6	Win	6–0	Jon Baguley	TKO	3 (6), 2:45	9 Oct 2009	York Hall, London, England	
5	Win	5–0	Baz Carey	TKO	3 (6), 2:03	22 May 2009	York Hall, London, England	
4	Win	4–0	Shaun Walton	TKO	1 (4), 2:12	30 Jan 2009	York Hall, London, England	
3	Win	3–0	Youssef Al Hamidi	PTS	4	6 Dec 2008	ExCeL, London, England	
2	Win	2–0	Johnny Greaves	KO	4 (4), 1:04	14 Jun 2008	York Hall, London, England	
1	Win	1–0	Daniel Thorpe	KO	1 (4), 1:57	2 Feb 2008	ExCeL, London, England	

Sporting positions
Regional boxing titles
Vacant Title last held by Ricky Burns	Commonwealth super-featherweight champion 23 October 2010 – May 2017; Vacated	Vacant Title next held by Andy Townend
Vacant Title last held by Eduard Troyanovsky	WBO European lightweight champion 14 July 2012 – September 2013; Vacated	Vacant Title next held by Stephen Ormond
New title	WBO International super-featherweight champion 21 September 2013 – March 2014; Vacated	Vacant Title next held by Juan Manuel López
Preceded by Gary Sykes	British super-featherweight champion 29 November 2014 – September 2016; Vacated	Vacant Title next held by Martin Joseph Ward
Vacant Title last held by ?	WBO European lightweight champion 9 November 2019 – ? Vacated	Vacant Title next held by ?
