= St. Paul's Boxing Academy, Hull =

Boxing club in Kingston upon Hull, England

St. Paul's Boxing Academy is a boxing club located in Kingston upon Hull, England. Founded in 1948, St. Paul's is the oldest boxing club in the city. The academy also boasts of being the largest Boxing club outside of London and one of the most successful in the country, producing champions such as Olympic gold medallist and world title challenger Luke Campbell MBE, and Commonwealth champion Tommy Coyle. The gym and facilities are currently undergoing a £500,000 refurbishment.
