= Orzubek Shayimov =

Uzbekistani boxer

Personal information
- Born: September 25, 1987 (age 37); Sirdaryo Region
- Height: 1.75 m (5 ft 9 in)

Sport
- Country: Uzbekistan
- Sport: Boxing
- Event: Bantamweight
- Coached by: Sharof Hudoiberdiev; Uygun Siddikov
- Updated on 29 July 2012

Orzubek Shayimov is an Uzbekistani boxer who competes as a bantamweight. At the 2012 Summer Olympics he was defeated in the heats of the Men's bantamweight by Brazil's Robenílson Vieira.
