= Enkhbatyn Badar-Uugan =

Mongolian boxer (born 1985)

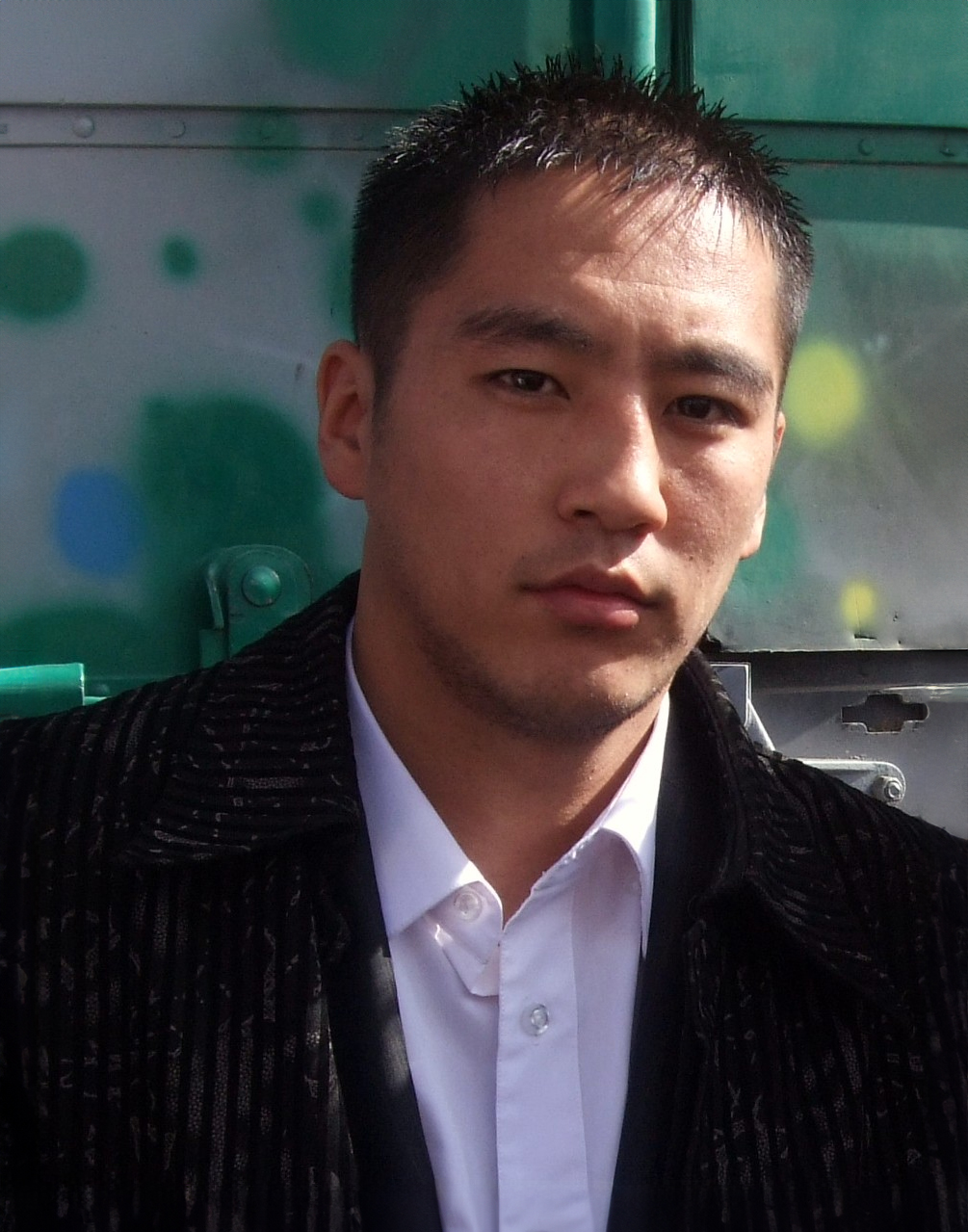
- 28 September 2008

Personal information
- Born: 3 June 1985 (age 41) Ulaanbaatar, Mongolia
- Height: 172 cm (5 ft 8 in)
- Weight: 54 kg (119 lb)

Boxing career
- Weight class: Bantamweight
Medal record
Men's boxing
Representing Mongolia
Olympic Games
Gold medal – first place	2008 Beijing	Bantamweight
World Amateur Championships
Silver medal – second place	2007 Chicago	Bantamweight
Asian Games
Bronze medal – third place	2006 Doha	Bantamweight
World University Championships
Gold medal – first place	2006 Almaty	Bantamweight
Asian Championships
Gold medal – first place	2007 Ulaanbaatar	Bantamweight
Bronze medal – third place	2005 Ho Chi Minh City	Flyweight

Enkhbatyn Badar-Uugan (Mongolian: Энхбатын Бадар-Ууган; born 3 June 1985, in Ulaanbaatar) is a retired boxer from Mongolia who became the first Olympic boxing champion from his country when he won the gold medal in the Bantamweight (-54 kg) division at the 2008 Summer Olympics. He was the second Mongolian to win an Olympic gold in any sport, with judoka Naidangiin Tüvshinbayar winning the first only a few days earlier.

== Career ==
At the 2006 Asian Games, he got the bronze medal following a lost bout against Korea's Han Soon Chul 19-29-.

At the 2007 World Championships, he won the silver medal after defeating Englishman Joe Murray 20-11 but losing in the finals 14–16, to Russia's Sergey Vodopyanov.

In 2007, he won a gold medal at Asian Senior Boxing Championship, Ulaanbaatar.

Badar-Uugan fought for Mongolia at the 2008 Summer Olympics in Beijing. American magazine Sports Illustrated picked him as the favorite to win Mongolia's first ever Olympic gold medal., which, however, was won by Naidangiin Tüvshinbayar, who competed earlier in the games.

=== World Amateur Championships results ===
2007

- Defeated Clive Atwell (Guyana) 25–8
- Defeated Vittorio Parrinello (Italy) 19–14
- Defeated David Oltvanyi (Hungary) 17–5
- Defeated Héctor Manzanilla (Venezuela) RSCI 3
- Defeated Joe Murray (England) 20–11
- Lost to Sergey Vodopyanov (Russia) 14–16

=== Olympic Games results ===
2008

- Defeated Óscar Valdez (Mexico) 15–4
- Defeated John Joe Nevin (Ireland) 9–2
- Defeated Khumiso Ikgopoleng (Botswana) 15–2
- Defeated Veaceslav Gojan (Moldova) 15–2
- Defeated Yankiel León (Cuba) 16-5
