= Héctor Manzanilla =

Venezuelan boxer (born 1985)

Personal information
- Born: June 28, 1985 (age 41)
Medal record
Men's Boxing
Representing Venezuela
South American Games
Gold medal – first place	2006 Buenos Aires	Bantamweight
Central American and Caribbean Games
Bronze medal – third place	2006 Cartagena	Bantamweight

Héctor Manzanilla Rangel (born June 28, 1985 in Los Teques, Miranda) is a Venezuelan bantamweight boxer who has won a bronze medal at the Central American Games. He is most respected for giving amateur superstar Guillermo Rigondeaux one of the toughest fights of his career.

== Career ==
At the Central American Games 2006 he lost to Mexican Arturo Santos Reyes in the semis.

At the ALBA Games in May 2007 in his home country he gave two-time Olympic champion, who came into this fight with a 96-bout winning streak stretching back to 2003, one of his toughest fights, losing only on countback +8:8 (36:38). (The 5:0 score on Rigondeaux's amateur record is misleading, all five judges voted for him).

He did not participate in the PanAm Games 2007.

At the 2007 World Amateur Boxing Championships where he lost to Mongolia's Enkhbatyn Badar-Uugan in the quarter final he qualified for the Olympics.

As of 2007, his record was 179-15.
