= Luke Boyd =

Australian boxer

Personal information
- Nationality: Australian
- Born: Australia
- Weight: Featherweight

Boxing career

Boxing record
- Total fights: 2
- Wins: 2
- Win by KO: 2
- Losses: 0

Luke Boyd (born 22 April 1987 in Sydney) is an Indigenous Australian professional boxer who competes as a featherweight. As an amateur, Boyd represented Australia at the 2008 Olympics, reaching the round of 32 of the bantamweight bracket.

== Amateur career ==
He was named New South Wales's Most Outstanding Boxer in 2006 and in 2007 was awarded an Australian Institute of Sport scholarship. He qualified for the 2008 Olympics, one of three indigenous boxers in the squad, but was beaten 18:8 out by Khumiso Ikgopoleng from Botswana in his first bout.

== Professional boxing record ==
2 fights	2 wins	0 losses
By knockout	2	0

No.	Result	Record	Opponent	Type	Round, time	Date	Location	Notes
2	Win	2–0	(Thailand) Pornchai Sithpajuk	TKO	2 (4), 1:30	22 Jul 2016	Mediterranean House, Five Dock, Australia	
1	Win	1–0	(Fiji) Krishna Mudaliar	KO	1 (4), 0:51	6 Dec 2014	Leagues Club, Cabramatta, Australia	Professional debut
