= Detelin Dalakliev =

Bulgarian boxer

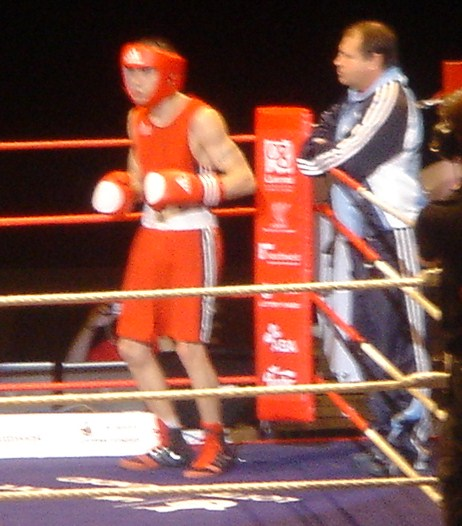

Personal information
- Full name: Детелин Далаклиев
- Nationality: Bulgaria
- Born: 19 February 1983 (age 43) Pleven
- Height: 1.71 m (5 ft 7 1/2 in)
- Weight: 60 kg (132 lb)

Sport
- Sport: Boxing
- Weight class: Bantamweight
- Club: BK Levski-Luchano, Sofia
Medal record
World Amateur Championships
Gold medal – first place	2009 Milan	Bantamweight
Bronze medal – third place	2003 Bangkok	Bantamweight
European Amateur Championships
Silver medal – second place	2006 Plovdiv	Bantamweight
Silver medal – second place	2008 Liverpool	Bantamweight
Bronze medal – third place	2004 Pula	Bantamweight
EU Amateur Championships
Gold medal – first place	2004 Madrid	Bantamweight
Gold medal – first place	2005 Cagliari	Bantamweight
Gold medal – first place	2007 Dublin	Bantamweight

Detelin Dalakliev (Bulgarian: Детелин Далаклиев) (born 19 February 1983) is a boxer from Bulgaria. He competed in the Bantamweight (– 54 kg) division, and won the gold medal at the World Amateur Boxing Championships in Milano 2009.

Dalakliev won bronze medals at the 2003 World Amateur Boxing Championships and 2001 and 2004 European Amateur Boxing Championships and a silver medal at the 2006 and 2008 European Amateur Boxing Championships.

He competed at the 2004 Summer Olympics, but was knocked out in the round of 16 by Aghasi Mammadov of Azerbaijan.

He represented Bulgaria at the 2008 European Amateur Boxing Championships in Liverpool, England. At the championships Dalakliev defeated Welshman Andrew Selby in the semifinals before facing inexperienced Englishman Luke Campbell in the final.

After four rounds Bulgarian levelled the scores in the fight to 5 each after he scored a point in the last two seconds of the fight. The decision then went to countback and Campbell was awarded the title making Campbell the first Englishman to win a European amateur title since 1961.

Dalakliev competed at the 2012 Summer Olympics, once again losing to Luke Campbell, this time in the quarter-finals.

In 2020 he opened his own boxing club in his birthplace of Pleven, Bulgaria.
