= Norbert Kalucza =

Hungarian boxer

Norbert Kalucza (born 4 December 1986) is a Hungarian amateur boxer who qualified for the 2008 Olympics.

== Career ==
He qualified for the Olympics by beating German boxer Marcel Schneider in the semi-final of a European qualifying tournament.
