= Joe Murray (British boxer) =

English boxer

Personal information
- Nickname: Genius
- Nationality: (England) English
- Born: Joseph Murray; 13 January 1987 (age 39) Manchester, England
- Height: 5 ft 8 in (1.73 m)
- Weight: Featherweight

Boxing career
- Stance: Orthodox

Boxing record
- Total fights: 26
- Wins: 23
- Win by KO: 10
- Losses: 3
- Draws: 0
- No contests: 0
Medal record
Men's Boxing
Representing England
World Amateur Championships
Bronze medal – third place	2007 Chicago	Bantamweight
EU Amateur Championships
Silver medal – second place	2006 Pécs	Bantamweight
Bronze medal – third place	2007 Dublin	Bantamweight

Joseph Murray (born 3 January 1987) is a former amateur boxer from Levenshulme, Manchester, England. He is best known for winning a medal at the 2007 World Amateur Boxing Championships at bantamweight and has signed professional terms with Hatton Promotions. His brother John is the former British Lightweight champion. He got married in Wilmslow Cheshire in March 2014. He is a former pupil of Wright Robinson Sports College in Gorton, Manchester.

== Amateur career ==
Murray, a former roommate of Amir Khan, represented the Moss Side ABC in the British championships semi-finals in 2006 winning a silver medal.

At the World Amateur Boxing Championships in Chicago Murray defeated Carlos Cuadras, Commonwealth Games silver medallist Mauritian, southpaw, Bruno Julie by 26:19. He lost to Enkhbatyn Badar-Uuganin the semis and won Bronze.

He joined teammates Frankie Gavin and Bradley Saunders in the medal ranks to qualify for the 2008 Summer Olympics in Beijing, China. Once there however Murray was defeated in the first round of by China's Gu Yu with a score of 17-7. Coach Terry Edwards complained about the scoring of the bout as being "very generous to the chinese" although he admitted that Murray hadn't boxed "his best" and was outboxed

== Professional career ==
Murray started his professional career at Altrincham's Leisure Centre against Sid Razak on 28 March 2009. He won on points in a 6-round contest.

== Professional boxing record ==
26 fights	23 wins	3 losses
By knockout	10	2
By decision	13	1

No.	Result	Record	Opponent	Type	Round, time	Date	Location	Notes
26	Lose	23-3	(United Kingdom) Lewis Ritson	TKO	1 (12)	25 Feb 2018	Victoria Warehouse, Manchester, United Kingdom	For BBBofC British lightweight title
25	Win	23-2	(Zimbabwe) Nkululeko Venganayi	TKO	8 (10)	10 Nov 2017	Victoria Warehouse, Manchester, United Kingdom	
24	Win	22-2	(United Kingdom) Matty Fagan	PTS	10	23 Sep 2017	Manchester Arena, Manchester, United Kingdom	
23	Win	21-2	(Wales) Henry Janes	PTS	8	17 Jun 2017	Victoria Warehouse, Manchester, United Kingdom	
22	Win	20-2	(Nicaragua) Reynaldo Cajina	KO	1 (10)	21 Apr 2017	Victoria Warehouse, Manchester, United Kingdom	
21	Win	19-2	(Denmark) Rashid Kassem	KO	6 (10)	15 Oct 2016	Arena Nord, Frederikshavn, Denmark	
20	Win	18-2	(United Kingdom) Danny Little	PTS	4	1 Oct 2016	Devonshire Dome, Buxton, United Kingdom	
19	Win	17-2	(United Kingdom) Ibrar Riyaz	PTS	6	16 Jul 2016	Victoria Warehouse, Manchester, United Kingdom	
18	Win	16-2	(Cameroon) Abdon Cesar	TKO	2 (6)	23 Apr 2016	Devonshire Dome, Buxton, United Kingdom	
17	Lose	15-2	(United Kingdom) Liam Walsh	TKO	5 (12)	28 Feb 2015	O2 Arena, London, United Kingdom	For BBBofC super featherweight title and Commonwealth super featherweight title
16	Win	15-1	(Hungary) Gyula Tallósi	TKO	2 (6)	28 Nov 2014	Bowlers Exhibition Centre, Manchester, United Kingdom	
15	Lose	14-1	(United Kingdom) Liam Walsh	MD	12	21 Sep 2013	Copper Box Arena, London, United Kingdom	For Commonwealth super featherweight title and vacant WBO International super featherweight title
14	Win	14-0	(United Kingdom) Dan Naylor	PTS	8	28 Jun 2013	Olympia, Liverpool, United Kingdom	
13	Win	13-0	(Wales) Dai Davies	PTS	8	20 Apr 2013	Wembley Arena, London, United Kingdom	
12	Win	12-0	(Venezuela) Jose Luis Graterol	PTS	8	4 Feb 2012	De Vere Whites Hotel, Bolton, United Kingdom	
11	Win	11-0	(United Kingdom) James Ancliff	UD	12	18 Jun 2011	Robin Park Centre, Wigan, United Kingdom	Won vacant IBF Youth Featherweight title
10	Win	10-0	(France) Daniel Kodjo Sassou	PTS	8	26 Feb 2011	De Vere Whites Hotel, Bolton, United Kingdom	
9	Win	9-0	(Italy) David Chianella	TKO	2 (6)	26 Nov 2010	De Vere Whites Hotel, Bolton, United Kingdom	
8	Win	8-0	(Hungary) Richárd Szebelédi	TKO	2 (6)	25 Sep 2010	Robin Park Centre, Wigan, United Kingdom	
7	Win	7-0	(Ukraine) Yuriy Voronin	PTS	8	26 Mar 2010	Goresbrook Leisure Centre, Dagenham, United Kingdom	
6	Win	6-0	(Georgia (country)) Giorgi Mtchedlishvili	KO	4 (6)	15 Jan 2010	Leisure Centre, Altrincham, United Kingdom	
5	Win	5-0	(United Kingdom) Barrington Brown	TKO	2 (4)	27 Nov 2009	Robin Park Centre, Wigan, United Kingdom	
4	Win	4-0	(United Kingdom) Delroy Spencer	TKO	1 (4)	25 Sep 2009	Velodrome, Manchester, United Kingdom	
3	Win	3-0	(United Kingdom) Steve Gethin	PTS	4	21 Aug 2009	Velodrome, Manchester, United Kingdom	
2	Win	2-0	(Mexico) Missael Nunez	UD	4	2 May 2009	MGM Grand Garden Arena, Las Vegas, United States	
1	Win	1-0	(United Kingdom) Sid Razak	PTS	6	28 Mar 2009	Leisure Centre, Altrincham, United Kingdom	Professional debut
