= Akhil Kumar =

Indian boxer (born 1981)

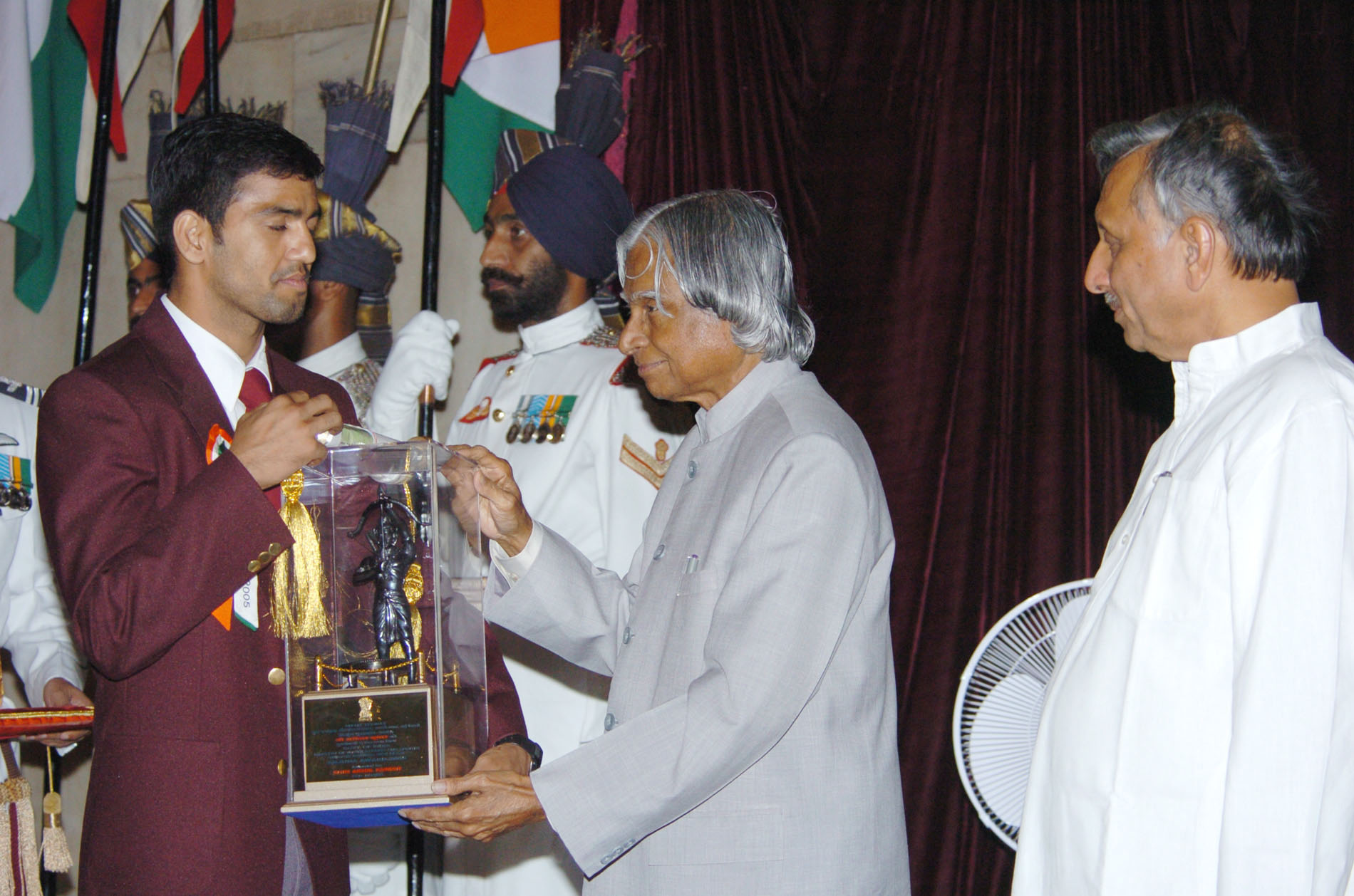
- President Kalam presenting Arjuna Award to Akhil Kumar.

Personal information
- Nationality: Indian
- Citizenship: Indian
- Born: 27 March 1981 (age 45) Bhiwani district, Haryana, India
- Occupation: Boxer Bantamweight
- Height: 168 cm (5 ft 6 in)
Medal record
Men's boxing
Representing India
Commonwealth Games
Gold medal – first place	2006 Melbourne	Bantamweight
Asian Championships
Bronze medal – third place	2007 Ulan Bator	Bantamweight

Akhil Kumar (born 27 March 1981) is an Indian boxer who has won several international and national boxing awards. He practices an "open guarded" boxing style. In 2005, the Indian government gave him the Arjuna Award for his achievements in international boxing. In March 2017, the Ministry of Youth Affairs and Sports, Government of India, appointed Akhil Kumar along with Mary Kom as national observers for boxing.

He is a member of Haryana Police Service cadre and currently serves as the deputy superintendent of police.

- Worked as Nation Observer, Boxing (Ministry of Youth Affairs and Sports, Government of India) from 2017 to 2019.
- Member: High Powered Committee of Khelo India.
- Member: TIDC (Talent Identification and Development Committee) Khelo India (Boxing)
- One of the Panellist of the National Anti Doping Agency (NADA) from 2017 to 2019 and from 2021 to till date.
- Appointed as the Selection Committee Member for the Rajiv Gandhi Khel Ratna and Arjuna Award in 2012. (Rajiv Gandhi Khel Ratna and Arjuna Award are National Awards. These are the award for the Best Sportsmen in India)
- Appointed as the Selection Committee Member for the Bhim Award in 2013. (Bhim Award is a State Award and it is an award for the best Sports person in Haryana)
- Competed One Year Regular SAI NS NIS Diploma in Sports Coaching (Boxing): Topper and A Grade.
- Selection Committee member (BFI) for selection of Indian Boxing team for international exposures.

== Career ==
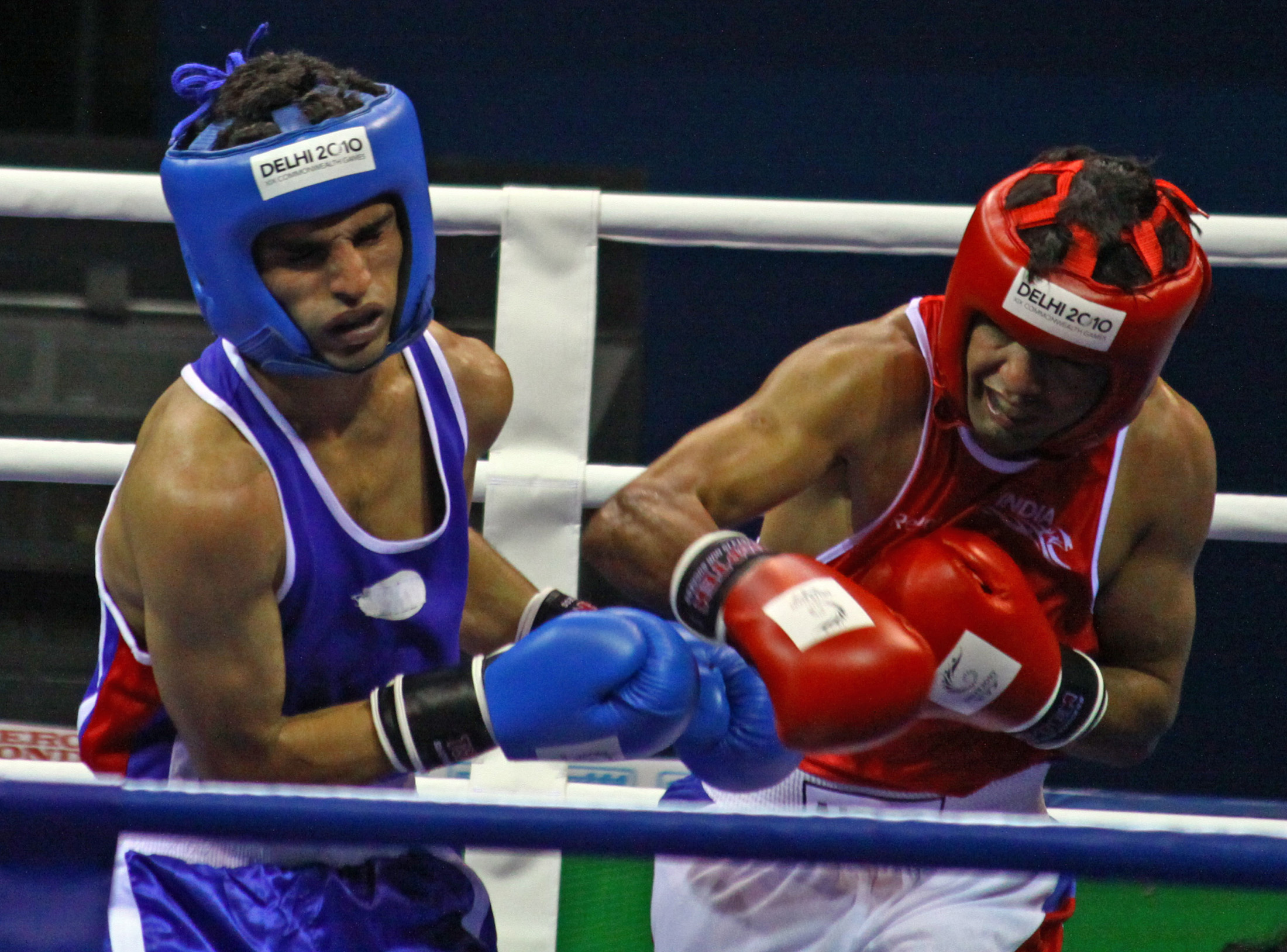
XIX Commonwealth Games-2010 Delhi (Boxing 56 kg) Akhil Kumar of India in an action against Qadir Khan of Pakistan, at Talkatora Stadium, New Delhi, on 7 October 2010

=== 1994–2012 ===
Kumar first competed in International boxing in 1999, winning a gold medal in the 6th YMCA Junior International Boxing Championship. In 2001 he won another gold medal in the International Invitational Boxing Championship in Russia. In 2003, he won a gold medal in the flyweight category by defeating Vilitio M Payla (Php) 20–16. He won a Best Boxer award three times, in addition to twelve gold, one silver, and four bronze medals.

=== 2004–2005 ===
Kumar qualified for the Athens Games by winning second place at the 1st AIBA Asian 2004 Olympic Qualifying Tournament in Guangzhou, China. In the first round he lost to Uzbekistan's Tulashboy Doniyorov. At the 2004 Olympics, he lost in the first round to Jerome Thomas.

In 2005 Kumar won the gold medal at the 4th Commonwealth Federation Boxing Championships in Glasgow, Scotland. He defeated Bongani Mahalangu of South Africa by a narrow margin of 18–17 in the 54 kg final.

=== 2006 Melbourne Commonwealth Games ===
In the 2006 Commonwealth Games he won the gold medal in the Bantamweight 54 kg category by edging out Nigerian Nestor Bolum and defeating Mauritian Bruno Julie in the final.

He landed six unanswered blows in the opening round of the final. The second round was quite even, with Kumar winning 5–4. He did slightly better in round 3, winning it 6–4, and despite losing the final round 3–4, succeeded in avoiding the single punch that might have cost him the tie.

=== 2008 Beijing Olympics and AIBA World Cup ===
Kumar qualified for the 2008 Olympic Games, beating among others the silver medallist from the 2004 Summer Olympics, Worapoj Petchkoom, at the Asian boxing qualifying tournament in Bangkok. At the Olympic event, he made his way to the second round in the Bantamweight 54 kg category beating Frenchman Ali Hallab on points 12–5. In the round of 16, he beat World Champion Sergey Vodopyanov, coming from 2–6 down in the second round of the bout. The score was tied 9–9 at the end of the fourth round but the judges decided in Kumar's favor because he landed a greater number of punches. He lost 3–10 to Veaceslav Gojan of Moldova in the quarter finals on 18 August 2008. He was coached by the Indian boxing coach Gurbaksh Singh Sandhu.

In the AIBA World Cup 2008 held in Moscow, Kumar beat Marcel Schinder of Germany in the quarterfinals with a margin of 15–6. In the semifinals the final score was a tie, 4-4, but this time, the judges awarded the match to his opponent. Kumar won a bronze.

=== 2012 London Olympics ===
Akhil Kumar was ruled out of the 2012 London Olympics; due to an injury he failed to reduce weight in time to take part in the Asian Continental Olympic qualification tournament, held in Astana (Kazakhstan) in April 2012.

== Awards ==
Kumar received the Arjuna award in 2005.
