= Joan Tipon =

Filipino boxer

Personal information
- Nickname: Joan
- Nationality: Filipino
- Born: Joan Tipon; April 9, 1982 (age 44) Philippines
- Height: 170 cm (5 ft 7 in)
- Weight: Bantamweight

Boxing career
- Stance: Orthodox

Boxing record
- Total fights: -
- Wins: -
- Win by KO: -
- Losses: -
- Draws: -
- No contests: -

Joan Tipon
Medal record

Men's Boxing

Representing the Philippines

Asian Games
Gold medal – first place	2006 Doha	Bantamweight

Asian Championships
Gold medal – first place	2005 Ho Chi Minh City	Bantamweight

Southeast Asian Games
Gold medal – first place	2005 Philippines	Bantamweight

Joan Tipon (born April 9, 1982) is a Filipino amateur boxer who won the gold medal at the 2006 Doha Asian Games in the bantamweight (under 54 kg.) division. He is a native of the province of Negros Occidental.

== Career ==
Tipon also competed at the 2005 Southeast Asian Games held in Bacolod, Philippines and won the gold medal in the same division against Tangtong Klongjian of Thailand 24–5.

At the Asian Games 2006 he upset Thailand's Worapoj Petchkoom and beat Han Soon Chul of Korea in the final 21–10.

At the World Championships 2007 he lost in the first round against Petchkoom 5:13.

As of 2012, Tipon was a full-time trainer for people who wanted to play boxing. He stated that: "Gusto kong magustuhan ng tao ang paglalaro ng boxing kasabay nito ay ang Ibahagi sa kanila ang salita ng Diyos" ("I'd like people to enjoy the sport of boxing and at the same time share with them the word of God").
