= Gu Yu =

Chinese boxer (born 1983)

Gu Yu (born June 12, 1983) is a Chinese amateur boxer who qualified for the 2008 Olympics in his native country at Bantamweight 54 kg. He is from Liaoning.

At the Asian Games 2006 the southpaw was upset in the first round. At the 2007 world championships he reached the quarter finals where he lost to Joe Murray.

In the 2008 Olympics, Gu was able to avenge his defeat to Murray by beating him convincingly.

In 2009 he again reached the quarterfinal at the world championships, losing to Irish boxer John Nevin.

== World amateur championship results ==
=== 2007 (as a bantamweight) ===
Defeated Naoto Uebayashi (Japan) RSCO 3

Defeated Huseyin Dundar (Turkey) 24–16

Defeated Mirzhan Rakhimzhanov (Kazakhstan) 25–8

Lost to Joe Murray (England) 11–14 (quarterfinal)

=== 2009 (as a bantamweight) ===
Defeated Claudio Marrero Guzman (Dominican Republic) 10–5

Defeated Veaceslav Gojan (Moldova) 13–2

Defeated McJoe Arroyo (Puerto Rico) 10–3

Lost to John Nevin (Ireland) 5–7 (quarterfinal)

=== Olympic games results ===
==== 2008 (as a bantamweight) ====
Defeated Joe Murray (Great Britain) 17–7

Lost to Veaceslav Gojan (Moldova) 6–13

=== Controversies ===
China's Gu Yu caused an upset in the Olympic boxing tournament on Tuesday by defeating Britain's Joe Murray in the bantamweight category.

Murray came into the competition as the world bronze medalist in the 54 kg division. Despite that, his reputations made minimal impact as Gu advanced into the last 16 with a 17–7 win that left the British camp fuming about poor judging.

Afterwards, Murray said making the weight limit had been a problem. His comments came just days after, Frankie Gavin, Britain's world lightweight champion, has been pulled out after officials feared for his health if he carried on trying to beat the scales.

Edwards, Murray's Coach, agreed with his fighter. 'The judges took it away from him. I thought they were very generous to the Chinese. You expect a slight bias but you come to the Olympic Games and expect a level playing field.'

There are five judges for Olympic bouts, none of whom were British or Chinese for Murray's fight. Points are recorded when at least three simultaneously press their buttons to record a hit but the reactions from the crowd can influence them.

'I am not saying Joe would have won but I am saying they forced him to do some things that weren't in his game plan. He didn't box the best I have seen him box but scoring makes a difference to the tactics and those had to be changed because of the scoring. The Ukrainians have already protested about the judging when one of their fighters lost to a Chinese,' said Edwards.

Murray's defeat followed the disappointment of Richard Faulds, the 2000 Olympic champion, who finished only sixth in the double trap.
