= Yankiel León =

Cuban Olympic boxer (b. 1982)

Personal information
- Born: 26 April 1982 (age 44)

Boxing career
Medal record
Men's Boxing
Representing Cuba
Olympic Games
Silver medal – second place	2008 Beijing	Bantamweight

Yankiel León Alarcón (born 26 April 1982 in Jobabo) is a Cuban amateur boxer best known for winning the bantamweight silver medal at the 2008 Olympics.

== Career ==
Leon won gold at the World Junior Championships in Budapest, Hungary in 2000 as a light flyweight. became senior national champion 2002 at flyweight then moved up.

At bantam he stood in the shadows of near-invincible two-time Olympic champion Guillermo Rigondeaux who beat him eight times. When Rigondeaux was out injured in 2007 Leon lost at the national championships to Yasniel Toledo.

After it became clear that the banned Rigondeaux would not be sent to Beijing, Leon trained harder and beat archrival Toledo and Yurien Fabregas at the nationals 2008.

He lost to local Dominican Claudio Marrero in the first round of the Copa Independencia but breezed through his qualifier, beating everybody including Marrero and fellow qualifier Oscar Valdez to easily make it to the Olympics.

He holds wins over Yan Bartelemí, Yuriorkis Gamboa and Iván Calderón (PUR) among others.

=== Olympic Games results ===
- 1st round bye
- Defeated Kanat Abutalipov (Kazakhstan) 10–3
- Defeated Worapoj Petchkoom (Thailand) 10–2
- Defeated Bruno Julie (Mauritius) 7–5
- Lost final to Enkhbatyn Badar-Uugan 5-16
