= Worapoj Petchkoom =

Thai boxer

Worapoj Petchkoom TBh
Personal information
- Full name: วรพจน์ เพชรขุ้ม
- Nationality: Thailand
- Born: May 18, 1981 (age 45) Phanom, Surat Thani
- Weight: 54 kg (119 lb)

Sport
- Sport: Boxing
- Weight class: Bantamweight
- Club: Royal Thai Army
Medal record
Olympic Games
Silver medal – second place	2004 Athens	Bantamweight
Asian Games
Gold medal – first place	2010 Guangzhou	Bantamweight
Bronze medal – third place	2006 Doha	Bantamweight
Sea Games
Gold medal – first place	1999 Southeast Asian Games	Bantamweight
Gold medal – first place	2003 Southeast Asian Games	Bantamweight
Gold medal – first place	2005 Southeast Asian Games	Bantamweight
Gold medal – first place	2007 Southeast Asian Games	Bantamweight

Worapoj Petchkoom (Thai: วรพจน์ เพชรขุ้ม; RTGS: Woraphot Phetkhum; born May 18, 1981) is a Thai boxer who competed in the bantamweight (54 kg) at the 2004 Summer Olympics and won the silver medal, after losing in the final to Cuban superstar Guillermo Rigondeaux. He had qualified for the Athens Games by topping the 2nd AIBA Asian 2004 Olympic Qualifying Tournament in Karachi, Pakistan. In the final, he defeated India's Diwakar Prasad.

== Amateur career ==
In 2005 he competed for Thailand at the Boxing World Cup in Moscow, Russia, losing both his matches in the preliminary round. At the Asian Games 2006 he lost to eventual winner Joan Tipon 13:13 (countback). At the world 2007 he was upset by Hungarian David Oltvanyi 9:10 in an early round.

=== Olympic results ===
2004 (as a bantamweight)

- Defeated Kim Won-Il (South Korea) RSC 3 (1:47)
- Defeated Khavazhi Khatsigov (Belarus) 33–18
- Defeated Nestor Bolum (Nigeria) 29–14
- Defeated Aghasi Mammadov (Azerbaijan) 27–19
- Lost to Guillermo Rigondeaux Ortiz (Cuba) 13–22

2008 (as a bantamweight)

- 1st round bye
- Defeated Vittorio Parrinello (Italy) 12–1
- Lost to Yankiel León (Cuba) 2–10

=== World Amateur Championships results ===
2007 (as a bantamweight)

- Defeated Joan Tipon (Philippines) 13–5
- Lost to David Oltvanyi (Hungary) 9–10

== 2009 Ban ==
In 2009, Petchkoom was banned from boxing for 3 months after he posed for photos in the gay lifestyle magazine Stage.

Olympic Games
Preceded by Paradorn Srichaphan	Flagbearer for Thailand; Beijing 2008	Succeeded by Nuttapong Ketin
