= Vittorio Parrinello =

Italian boxer (born 1983)

Personal information
- Nationality: Italian
- Born: 8 August 1983 (age 43) Piedimonte Matese, Italy
- Height: 1.69 m (5 ft 6 1/2 in)
- Weight: Super bantamweight Featherweight; Super featherweight

Boxing career
- Stance: Orthodox

Boxing record
- Total fights: 16
- Wins: 11
- Win by KO: 2
- Losses: 5

Jahyn Vittorio Parrinello (born 8 August 1983) is an Italian professional boxer. As an amateur he competed in the 2008 and 2012 Olympics.

== Career ==
At the 2008 Olympics at bantamweight he lost his first fight to 2004 silver medalist Worapoj Petchkoom 1:12

At the 2009 World Championships he lost his first bout to Denis Makarov.

At the 2011 World Amateur Boxing Championships he lost his second bout.

At the 2012 Summer Olympics (results) he beat Namibian Jonas Matheus but lost to the eventual winner, local Luke Campbell 9:11.

== Professional boxing record ==
21 fights	21 wins	0 losses
By knockout	16	0
By decision	5	0

No.	Result	Record	Opponent	Type	Round, time	Date	Location	Notes
16	Loss	11–5	(Italy) Suat Laze	SD	10	21 Dec 2019	Alzate Brianza, Italy	For vacant Italy featherweight title
15	Loss	11–4	(Ukraine) Oleg Malynovskyi	UD	8	5 Oct 2019	Ice Palace "Terminal", Brovary, Ukraine	
14	Win	11–3	(Italy) Maycol Escobar	PTS	6	14 Jul 2019	Tricase, Italy	
13	Loss	10–3	(Malta) Haithem Laamouz	UD	10	23 Mar 2019	Corradino Sports Pavilion, Paola, Malta	For vacant WBC Mediterranean super featherweight title
12	Win	10–2	(Italy) Fabrizio Trotta	PTS	6	18 Nov 2018	La Scuola Media “Giacomo Vitale”, Piedimonte Matese, Italy	
11	Loss	9–2	(Italy) Iuliano Gallo	RTD	2 (10), 3:00	21 Apr 2018	Palestra Comunale, Ronago, Italy	For vacant Italy super bantamweight title; retired due to injury
10	Loss	9–1	(Italy) Luca Rigoldi	SD	12	20 May 2017	Palasport, Vicenza, Italy	For EBU European Union super bantamweight title
9	Win	9–0	(Croatia) Mirsad Ahmeti	TKO	4 (6)	21 Dec 2016	Stazione Birra, Rome, Italy	
8	Win	8–0	(Italy) Gheorghe Trandafir	PTS	6	30 Jul 2016	Fiumicino, Italy	
7	Win	7–0	(Italy) Luca Rigoldi	UD	10	18 Mar 2016	PalaGoldoni, Vicenza, Italy	Retained Italy super bantamweight title
6	Win	6–0	(Hungary) Peter Mellar	PTS	6	19 Dec 2015	Auditorium Liceo Galilei, Piedimonte Matese, Italy	
5	Win	5–0	(Italy) Daniele Limone	TD	5 (10)	8 Aug 2015	Gatteo, Italy	Won vacant Italy super bantamweight title
4	Win	4–0	(Croatia) Antonio Horvatic	PTS	6	13 Mar 2015	Palasport, Falconara Marittima, Italy	
3	Win	3–0	(Italy) Luca Genovese	PTS	6	31 Oct 2014	Palazzetto dello Sport, Rezzato, Italy	
2	Win	2–0	(Italy) Giuseppe Bergantino	PTS	6	29 Aug 2014	Stadio Mazzella, Ischia, Italy	
1	Win	1–0	(Slovakia) Ambroz Horvath	TKO	3 (6)	20 Jun 2014	Palasport di Largo Anguissola, Piacenza, Italy	
