= Khavazhi Khatsigov =

Belarusian boxer (born 1977)

Medal record

Representing Belarus

Men's Boxing

European Amateur Championships
Gold medal – first place	2002 Perm	Bantamweight

Khavazhi Khatsigov (born 17 April 1977 in Grozny) is a boxer from Belarus.

He was born in Russia, but after his failure to join the Russian national team (Raimkul Malakhbekov was the No.1 Russian bantamweight in that time), he moved to Belarus in 1999.

Khatsigov won a gold medal at the 2002 European Amateur Boxing Championships in Perm, Russia.

He qualified for the 2004 Summer Olympics by ending up in second place at the 4th AIBA European 2004 Olympic Qualifying Tournament in Baku, Azerbaijan. In Athens, Greece he defeated Juan Manuel López (boxer) but lost in the second round of the Bantamweight (54 kg) division to Thailand's eventual runner-up Worapoj Petchkoom.

He also qualified for the 2008 Summer Olympics, but was edged out by Veaceslav Gojan in his first bout.
