= Veaceslav Gojan =

Moldovan boxer (born 1983)

Personal information
- Born: 18 May 1983 (age 43) Grimăncăuți, Moldavian SSR, Soviet Union
- Height: 162 cm (5 ft 4 in)
- Weight: 56 kg (123 lb)

Sport
- Weight class: Bantamweight
Medal record
Men's Boxing
Representing Moldova
Olympic Games
Bronze medal – third place	2008 Beijing	Bantamweight
European Amateur Championships
Gold medal – first place	2011 Ankara	Bantamweight
Silver medal – second place	2002 Perm	Light Flyweight

Veaceslav Gojan (born 18 May 1983) is a Moldovan amateur boxer who won Bantamweight bronze at the 2008 Olympics. He comes from the village of Grimăncăuţi, in Briceni north-west Moldova, and is a member of the Central Sport Club Dinamo in Chişinău. His coach is Petru Caduc.

== Career ==
Gojan failed to qualify for the 2004 Summer Olympics after ending up in third place at the 4th AIBA European 2004 Olympic Qualifying Tournament in Baku, Azerbaijan.

He qualified for the 2008 Summer Olympics by beating German boxer Rustamhodza Rahimov in the semifinal of a European qualifying tournament. In Beijing he made it to the semifinal by defeating Khavazhi Khatsigov (Belarus) 1-1, countback, Gu Yu (China) 13-6 and Akhil Kumar (India) 10-3 then he lost to Mongolian Enkhbatyn Badar-Uugan 2:15. (Boxing at the 2008 Summer Olympics – Bantamweight)

He won the 2011 European Amateur Boxing Championships. At the 2012 Olympic qualifier he lost his first bout vs Pavlo Ishchenko and didn't make it.

=== World Series of Boxing record ===
10 fights	7 wins	3 losses
By knockout	0	0
By decision	7	3

No.	Result	Record	Team	Opponent (Team)	Type	Round, time	Date	Location	Notes
10	Win	7–3	German Eagles	(Wales) Sean McGoldrick (British Lionhearts)	PTS	5	23 Feb 2013	Hannover, Germany	
9	Loss	6–3	German Eagles	(United States) Shawn Simpson (USA Knockouts)	PTS	5	9 Feb 2013	Reno, United States	
8	Win	6–2	German Eagles	(Italy) Vittorio Parrinello (Italia Thunder)	TKO	1 (5)	18 Jan 2013	Göppingen, Germany	
7	Win	5–2	German Eagles	(United States) Shawn Simpson (USA Knockouts)	PTS	5	7 Dec 2012	Göppingen, Germany	
6	Win	4–2	German Eagles	(Italy) Vincenzo Picardi (Italia Thunder)	PTS	5	17 Nov 2012	Milan, Italy	
5	Loss	3–2	Milano Thunder	(Russia) Magomed Kurbanov (Baku Fires)	PTS	5	30 Mar 2012	Baku, Azerbaijan	
4	Win	3–1	Milano Thunder	(France) Geoffrey dos Santos (Paris United)	W/O	-	5 Mar 2012	Paris, France	
3	Win	2–1	Milano Thunder	(Thailand) Apichet Petchmanee (Bangkok Elephants)	PTS	5	10 Feb 2012	Milan, Italy	
2	Loss	1–1	Milano Thunder	(United States) Rau'shee Warren (Los Angeles Matadors)	PTS	5	22 Jan 2012	Hollywood, United States	
1	Win	1–0	Milano Thunder	(United States) Edwin Sandoval (Los Angeles Matadors)	PTS	5	18 Nov 2011	Milan, Italy	WSB debut
