= John Joe Nevin =

Irish boxer

Personal information
- Nationality: Irish
- Born: John Joseph Nevin; 7 June 1989 (age 37) Mullingar, Ireland
- Height: 5 ft 8 in (173 cm)
- Weight: Super-Featherweight

Boxing career
- Reach: 67 in (170 cm)
- Stance: Orthodox

Boxing record
- Total fights: 17
- Wins: 17
- Win by KO: 6
- Losses: 0
Medal record
Representing Ireland
Olympic Games
Silver medal – second place	2012 London	Bantamweight
World Amateur Championships
Bronze medal – third place	2009 Milan	Bantamweight
Bronze medal – third place	2011 Baku	Bantamweight
European Amateur Championships
Gold medal – first place	2013 Minsk	Bantamweight
European Union Amateur Championships
Gold medal – first place	2008 Cetniewo	Bantamweight
Silver medal – second place	2009 Odense	Bantamweight

John Joseph Nevin (born 7 June 1989) is an Irish professional boxer. He is a two-time Olympian, and a London 2012 silver medalist.

== Early life ==
John Joseph Nevin was born in Mullingar, County Westmeath, and is a member of the Traveller community.

== Amateur career ==
=== 2008 | Olympic Games qualifying tournament ===
Nevin qualified for the 2008 Beijing Olympics by winning the first Olympic Qualifying Tournament in Italy.

=== 2008 | European Union Amateur Championships ===
Nevin won the 2008 EU Amateur Championships in Cetniewo, Poland.

=== 2008 | Olympic Games ===
At just 18 years of age, Nevin competed in Beijing at his first Summer Olympics. He beat Abdelhalim Ourradi 9–4 in his first round before being beaten by Badar-Uugan Enkhbatyn 9–2 in the round of 16. Enkhbatyn went on to win gold in the final.

=== 2009 | World Amateur Championships ===
On 9 September 2009, Nevin guaranteed Ireland a historic sixth medal at the 2009 World Amateur Boxing Championships after he beat China's Yu Gu in Milan. He won his quarter-final 7–5. In the semi-final he lost by 5–4 to Russian Eduard Abzalimov, and so took away a bronze medal.

=== 2011 | World Amateur Championships ===
At the 2011 World Boxing Championships in Baku, Azerbaijan, Nevin reached the semi-finals after beating Orzubek Shaymov of Uzbekistan 19–17 in the quarter's. Nevin lost to Britain's Luke Campbell in the semi's through a very controversial countback, forcing him to settle for a second World Championship bronze medal. This however was more than enough to qualify Nevin for the 2012 London Olympics.

=== 2012 | Olympic Games ===
Nevin won his first fight in London, defeating Denmark's Dennis Ceylan by a wide margin of 21–6. In his second fight of the games he saw off Kazakhstan's Kanat Abutalipov by a margin of 15–10. In his quarter-final bout he beat Oscar Valdez to secure a semi-final place and the guarantee of at least a bronze medal.

He reached the final after defeating the reigning bantamweight world champion Lázaro Álvarez of Cuba, 19–14. In the final however, Nevin lost 14–11 to Britain's Luke Campbell, winning a silver medal in the process. Nevin reportedly said that he wants his legacy from the Games to be "a closer relationship between Travellers and the settled community."

=== 2013: European Amateur Championships ===
In June 2013 he won a gold medal at the 2013 European Amateur Boxing Championships in the Bantamweight division.

=== National Titles ===
In 2012, Nevin won his fifth straight national senior title, incidentally beating his cousin Michael Nevin 23–3 in the final. Nevin was unable to defend his national title in 2013 because he injured his wrist while sparring in the high performance, the title was taken by Declan Geraghty from Crumlin boxing club. That didn't stop the Irish Amateur Boxing Association from picking Nevin as their #1 choice for the 2013 European Boxing Championships being held in Minsk later that year.

== Professional career ==
Having announced the previous year that he planned on turning professional, Nevin finally did so in 2013. Speaking on 22 October, he said "This is the next step for me. I've done everything I wanted to do in the amateur business, if I could change the colour of the Olympic medal I would but that's done and now it's time to move on and hopefully bring back a world title to Ireland." Nevin signed a management deal with a business sports partnership that includes GreenBlood Boxing from Philadelphia and Berkley Sports & Media from London.

Nevin made his professional debut in a super featherweight bout on 17 March 2014 against Alberto Candelaria, winning by unanimous decision.

After a five-year break from the sport he returned to fighting in August 2024 with a points victory over Jose Hernandez Flores. In February 2025 he defeated Gerson Escobar Romero in one round. Nevin moved his record to 17–0 in April 2025 defeating Jonathan Chavez after two rounds. Nevin moved to 18–0 in November 2025 with a win by unanimous decision over the Mexican boxer, Juan Perez Vazquez.

== Personal life ==
He is married with three children.

== Controversy ==
Nevin has frequently attracted controversy through his involvement in several high-profile public order incidents. In 2013, Nevin was arrested and charged following a drunken altercation with his father in a public street in Mullingar.

== Professional boxing record ==
17 fights	17 wins	0 losses
By knockout	6	0
By decision	11	0

No.	Result	Record	Opponent	Type	Round, time	Date	Location	Notes
17	Win	17-0	(Mexico) Jonathan Chavez	TKO	2 (10)	26 April 2025	Cuernavaca, Mexico	
16	Win	16-0	(Mexico) Gerson Escobar Romer	TKO	1 (8)	2 February 2025	Salon Rosas, Jiutepec, Mexico	
15	Win	15-0	(Mexico) Jose Fernadez Florez	PTS	6	17 Aug 2024	Salon Rosas, Jiutepec, Mexico	
14	Win	14-0	(Nicaragua) Freddy Fonseca	UD	10	16 Nov 2019	(United Kingdom) York Hall, London, England	Won vacant WBA International super-featherweight title
13	Win	13-0	(United Kingdom) Jordan Ellison	PTS	8	20 Sep 2019	(United Kingdom) Vale Sports Arena, Cardiff, Wales	
12	Win	12-0	(Colombia) Andres Figueroa	UD	6	15 Mar 2019	(United States) Liacouras Center, Philadelphia, Pennsylvania, US	
11	Win	11-0	(Nicaragua) Reynaldo Cajina	PTS	8	15 Dec 2018	(United Kingdom) York Hall, London, England	
10	Win	10-0	(Canada) Alex Torres Rynn	UD	8	9 Mar 2018	(United States) Parx Casino, Bensalem, Pennsylvania, US	
9	Win	9-0	(United Kingdom) Lee Connelly	PTS	6	24 Nov 2017	(United Kingdom) Tolworth Recreation Centre, London, England	
8	Win	8-0	(United States) Jesus Lule	UD	6	27 Aug 2016	(United States) SugarHouse Casino, Philadelphia, Pennsylvania, US	
7	Win	7-0	(United States) Greg Coverson Jr.	UD	6	25 Nov 2015	(United States) Horseshoe Casino, Hammond, Indiana, US	
6	Win	6-0	(United States) DeWayne Wisdom	UD	4	14 Nov 2015	(United States) ABC Sports Complex, Springfield, Virginia, US	
5	Win	5-0	(United States) Jose L Guzman	TKO	3 (6)	16 Oct 2015	(United States) Aviator Sports Complex, New York City, New York, US	
4	Win	4-0	(Mexico) Victor Raul Capaceta	RTD	3 (4)	25 Aug 2015	(United States) MCU Park, New York City, New York, US	
3	Win	3-0	(United Kingdom) Jack Heath	TKO	1 (6)	15 Nov 2014	(Republic of Ireland) 3Arena, Dublin, Ireland	
2	Win	2-0	(United States) Calvin Stifford	TKO	1 (4)	11 Oct 2014	(United States) Ring of Dreams Boxing Gym, Winston-Salem, North Carolina, US	
1	Win	1-0	(Puerto Rico) Alberto Candelaria	UD	6	17 Mar 2014	(United States) House of Blues, Boston, Massachusetts, US	
