= Ireland at the 2012 Summer Olympics =

- IOC code: IRL
- NOC: Olympic Federation of Ireland
- Website: olympics.ie

in London
- Competitors: 66 in 14 sports
- Flag bearers: Katie Taylor (opening); Darren O'Neill (closing)
- Medals Ranked 41st: Gold 1 Silver 1 Bronze 4 Total 6

Summer Olympics appearances (overview)
- 1924; 1928; 1932; 1936; 1948; 1952; 1956; 1960; 1964; 1968; 1972; 1976; 1980; 1984; 1988; 1992; 1996; 2000; 2004; 2008; 2012; 2016; 2020; 2024

Other related appearances
- Great Britain (1896–1920)

Ireland competed at the 2012 Summer Olympics in London, United Kingdom, from 27 July to 12 August 2012. This was the nation's twentieth appearance at the Summer Olympics.

The Olympic Council of Ireland sent a total of 66 athletes to the Games, 36 men and 30 women, to compete in 14 sports. The International Olympic Committee allowed athletes from Northern Ireland the option to compete at the Olympic Games for either Great Britain or Ireland. Medallists Paddy Barnes and Michael Conlan were both born in Belfast, Northern Ireland and chose to compete for Team Ireland. Ireland had only a single competitor in the sprint canoeing, track cycling, equestrian dressage, judo, rowing and shooting events.

This was Ireland's most successful Olympics, winning a total of 5 medals (1 gold, 1 silver and 3 bronze) after left London in three sports: boxing, athletics and equestrian show jumping. Boxer Katie Taylor, who was Ireland's flag bearer at the opening ceremony, won Ireland's first Olympic gold medal in 16 years. Light flyweight boxer Paddy Barnes defended his bronze medal from Beijing, becoming the second Irish athlete in 80 years to win medals at two consecutive Olympics. For the first time since 1980, Ireland also won an Olympic medal in more than a single sport.

On 24 March 2016, race walker co-fourth placer Robert Heffernan was upgraded to bronze after the original gold medalist Sergey Kirdyapkin of Russia disqualified due to doping, that became a total of 6 medals.

== Medallists ==
| Medal | Name | Sport | Event | Date |
|---|---|---|---|---|
| Gold | Katie Taylor | Boxing | Women's lightweight | 9 August |
| Silver | John Joe Nevin | Boxing | Men's bantamweight | 11 August |
| Bronze | Cian O'Connor | Equestrian | Individual jumping | 8 August |
| Bronze | Paddy Barnes | Boxing | Men's light flyweight | 10 August |
| Bronze | Michael Conlan | Boxing | Men's flyweight | 10 August |
| Bronze | Robert Heffernan | Athletics | Men's 50 kilometres walk | 11 August |

Medals by sport
| Sport | 1st place, gold medalist(s) | 2nd place, silver medalist(s) | 3rd place, bronze medalist(s) | Total |
| Boxing | 1 | 1 | 2 | 4 |
| Athletics | 0 | 0 | 1 | 1 |
| Equestrian | 0 | 0 | 1 | 1 |
| Total | 1 | 1 | 4 | 6 |

== International media coverage ==
Katie Taylor's Olympic boxing success led to inaccurate coverage in the international media. While previewing her semi-final bout, The Daily Telegraph, a conservative English newspaper, incorrectly referred to Taylor as "British", prompting fierce criticism from other media outlets, and an apology from the Telegraph. Fairfax Media of Australia also issued an apology, after articles published in The Age, Brisbane Times and The Sydney Morning Herald were widely condemned as "lazy stereotyping" of the Irish. Irish Ambassador to Australia Noel White issued a formal complaint about the article's reliance on Guinness, whiskey and potatoes to make a story. USA Today was criticised after its article said: "Back home on the emerald-green isle, pints of Guinness flowed freely, perhaps enough to replenish the Irish Sea. The "punters" inside betting parlors [sic] wagered pounds [sic] as if they were bits of candy. It is not hyperbole to suggest that, when Taylor entered the ring, the weight of a prideful, scuffling nation rested on her muscular shoulders." Also, Australian commentator Russell Barwick provoked "fury" while on ESPN, comparing Team Ireland's independence from Team GB to Tasmanian athletes not performing for Australia.

== Athletics ==
The Irish team selection caused a number of controversies. In the women's marathon Linda Byrne, Ava Hutchinson and Caitriona Jennings were selected while Maria McCambridge, who had also run the 'A' qualifying standard missed out on selection, as only three athletes from a nation may compete in the event. Additionally the deadline for qualification for the marathon had been changed to allow Barbara Sanchez, who holds dual Irish and French citizenship, a chance to qualify. The team for the women's 4 × 400 metres relay was changed after Joanna Mills won an appeal of her exclusion on the grounds of having a faster time than Catriona Cuddihy who had initially been selected.

Irish athletes achieved qualifying standards in the following athletics events (up to a maximum of 3 athletes in each event at the 'A' Standard, and 1 at the 'B' Standard):

Key

- Note–Ranks given for track events are within the athlete's heat only
- Q = Qualified for the next round
- q = Qualified for the next round as a fastest loser or, in field events, by position without achieving the qualifying target
- NR = National record
- N/A = Round not applicable for the event
- Bye = Athlete not required to compete in round

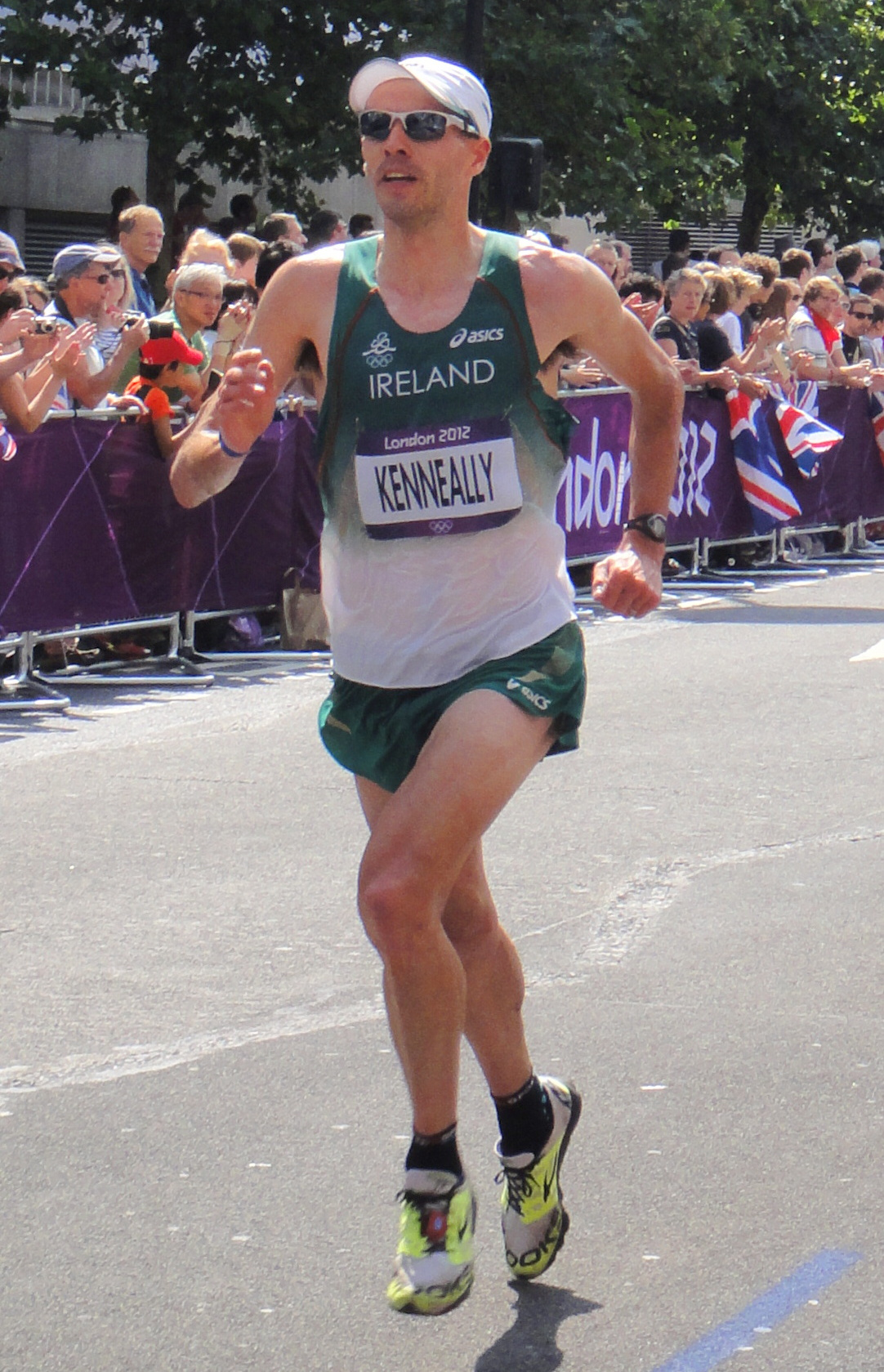
Mark Kenneally in men's marathon

Men
Track & road events

| Athlete | Event | Heat | | Semifinal | | Final | |
| Athlete | Event | Result | Rank | Result | Rank | Result | Rank |
|---|---|---|---|---|---|---|---|
| Paul Hession | 200 m | 20.69 | 5 | Did not advance | | | |
| Ciarán O'Lionaird | 1500 m | 3:48.35 | 13 | —N/a | | Did not advance | |
| Alistair Cragg | 5000 m | 13:47.01 | 17 | —N/a | | Did not advance | |
| Mark Kenneally | Marathon | —N/a | | | | 2:21:13 | 57 |
| Robert Heffernan | 20 km walk | —N/a | | | | 1:20:18 | 9 |
| Brendan Boyce | 50 km walk | —N/a | | | | 3:55:01 | 29 |
| Colin Griffin | 50 km walk | —N/a | | | | DSQ | |
| Robert Heffernan | 50 km walk | —N/a | | | | 3:37:54 NR | 3rd place, bronze medalist(s) |

Women
Track & road events

| Athlete | Event | Heat | | Semifinal | | Final | |
| Athlete | Event | Result | Rank | Result | Rank | Result | Rank |
|---|---|---|---|---|---|---|---|
| Joanne Cuddihy | 400 m | 52.09 | 4 q | 51.88 | 5 | Did not advance | |
| Fionnuala Britton | 5000 m | 15:12.97 | 10 | —N/a | | Did not advance | |
| Fionnuala Britton | 10000 m | —N/a | | | | 31:46.71 | 15 |
| Derval O'Rourke | 100 m hurdles | 12.91 | 4 q | 12.91 | 5 | Did not advance | |
| Stephanie Reilly | 3000 m steeplechase | 9:44.77 | 9 | —N/a | | Did not advance | |
| Jessie Barr; Claire Bergin; Michelle Carey; Catriona Cuddihy; Joanne Cuddihy; Marian Heffernan | 4 × 400 m relay | 3:30.55 | 6 | —N/a | | Did not advance | |
| Linda Byrne | Marathon | —N/a | | | | 2:37:13 | 66 |
| Ava Hutchinson | Marathon | —N/a | | | | 2:37:17 | 68 |
| Caitriona Jennings | Marathon | —N/a | | | | 3:22:11 | 107 |
| Olive Loughnane | 20 km walk | —N/a | | | | 1:29:39 | 13 |
| Laura Reynolds | 20 km walk | —N/a | | | | 1:31:02 | 20 |

Field events

| Athlete | Event | Qualification | | Final | |
| Athlete | Event | Distance | Position | Distance | Position |
|---|---|---|---|---|---|
| Tori Pena | Pole vault | NM | — | Did not advance | |
| Deirdre Ryan | High jump | 1.85 | 27 | Did not advance | |

== Badminton ==
Ireland qualified two badminton players for the Games. Scott Evans competed in the men's singles and Chloe Magee in the women's singles.; each made their second appearance at an Olympic Games.

| Athlete | Event | Group stage | | | Elimination | Quarterfinal | Semifinal | Final / BM | |
| Athlete | Event | Opposition Score | Opposition Score | Rank | Opposition Score | Opposition Score | Opposition Score | Opposition Score | Rank |
|---|---|---|---|---|---|---|---|---|---|
| Scott Evans | Men's singles | Lin D (CHN); L 8–21 14–21 | —N/a | 2 | Did not advance | | | | |
| Chloe Magee | Women's singles | Hosny (EGY); W 21–17 21–6 | Pi (FRA); L 21–16 18–21 14–21 | 2 | Did not advance | | | | |

== Boxing ==
Ireland qualified boxers for the following events.

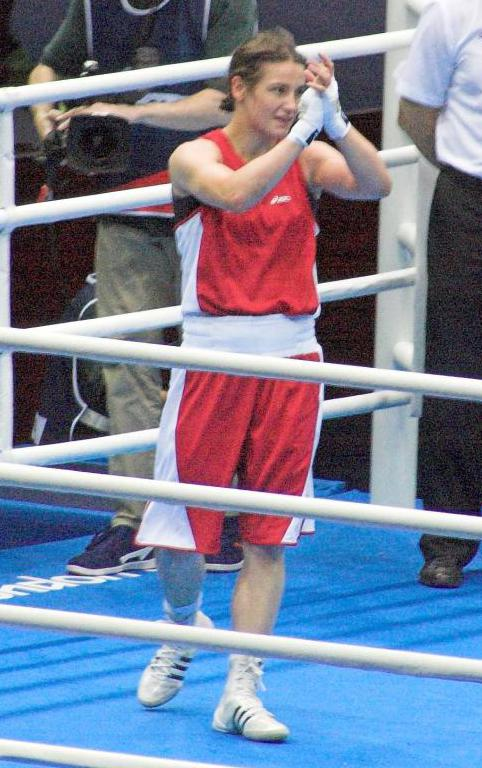
Boxer Katie Taylor wins Ireland's first gold in 16 years

Men

| Athlete | Event | Round of 32 | Round of 16 | Quarterfinals | Semifinals | Final | |
| Athlete | Event | Opposition Result | Opposition Result | Opposition Result | Opposition Result | Opposition Result | Rank |
|---|---|---|---|---|---|---|---|
| Paddy Barnes | Light flyweight | Bye | Essomba (CMR); W 15–10 | Singh (IND); W 23–18 | Zou (CHN); L 15–15^{+} | Did not advance | 3rd place, bronze medalist(s) |
| Michael Conlan | Flyweight | Bye | Micah (GHA); W 19–8 | Oubaali (FRA); W 22–18 | Ramírez (CUB); L 10–20 | Did not advance | 3rd place, bronze medalist(s) |
| John Joe Nevin | Bantamweight | Ceylan (DEN); W 21–6 | Abutalipov (KAZ); W 15–10 | Valdez (MEX); W 19–13 | Álvarez (CUB); W 19–14 | Campbell (GBR); L 11–14 | 2nd place, silver medalist(s) |
| Adam Nolan | Welterweight | Sánchez (ECU); W 14–8 | Zamkovoy (RUS); L 9–18 | Did not advance | | | |
| Darren O'Neill | Middleweight | Akanji (NGR); W 15–6 | Hartel (GER); L 12–19 | Did not advance | | | |

Women

| Athlete | Event | Round of 16 | Quarterfinals | Semifinals | Final | |
| Athlete | Event | Opposition Result | Opposition Result | Opposition Result | Opposition Result | Rank |
|---|---|---|---|---|---|---|
| Katie Taylor | Lightweight | Bye | Jonas (GBR); W 26–15 | Chorieva (TJK); W 17–9 | Ochigava (RUS); W 10–8 | 1st place, gold medalist(s) |

== Canoeing ==
=== Slalom ===
Ireland qualified boats for the following events.

| Athlete | Event | Preliminary | | | | | | Semifinal | | Final | |
| Athlete | Event | Run 1 | Rank | Run 2 | Rank | Total | Rank | Time | Rank | Time | Rank |
|---|---|---|---|---|---|---|---|---|---|---|---|
| Eoin Rheinisch | Men's K-1 | 89.97 | 6 | 90.72 | 11 | 89.97 | 12 Q | 153.98 | 14 | Did not advance | |
| Hannah Craig | Women's K-1 | 117.07 | 14 | 108.99 | 11 | 108.99 | 14 Q | 116.12 | 10 Q | 127.36 | 9 |

=== Sprint ===
Ireland qualified boats for the following events.

| Athlete | Event | Heats | | Semifinals | | Final | |
| Athlete | Event | Time | Rank | Time | Rank | Time | Rank |
|---|---|---|---|---|---|---|---|
| Andrzej Jezierski | Men's C-1 200 m | 41.404 | 2 Q | 42.012 | 4 FB | 44.041 | 9 |

Qualification Legend: FA = Qualify to final (medal); FB = Qualify to final B (non-medal)

== Cycling ==
=== Road ===
| Athlete | Event | Time | Rank |
|---|---|---|---|
| Dan Martin | Men's road race | 5:46:37 | 90 |
| David McCann | Men's road race | 5:46:37 | 55 |
| David McCann | Men's time trial | 56:03.77 | 27 |
| Nicolas Roche | Men's road race | 5:46:37 | 89 |

=== Track ===
Omnium

| Athlete | Event | Flying lap | | Points race | | Elimination race | Individual pursuit | | Scratch race | Time trial | | Total points | Rank |
| Athlete | Event | Time | Rank | Points | Rank | Rank | Time | Rank | Rank | Time | Rank | Total points | Rank |
|---|---|---|---|---|---|---|---|---|---|---|---|---|---|
| Martyn Irvine | Men's omnium | 13.504 | 9 | 47 | 6 | 15 | 4:32:948 | 14 | 9 | 1:04:558 | 11 | 64 | 13 |

== Equestrian ==
By rankings Ireland qualified one athlete in dressage, an eventing team and two athletes in jumping.

=== Dressage ===
| Athlete | Horse | Event | Grand Prix | | Grand Prix Special | | Grand Prix Freestyle | | Overall | |
| Athlete | Horse | Event | Score | Rank | Score | Rank | Technical | Artistic | Score | Rank |
|---|---|---|---|---|---|---|---|---|---|---|
| Anna Merveldt | Coryolano | Individual | 69.772 | 33 | Did not advance | | | | | |

=== Eventing ===
| Athlete | Horse | Event | Dressage | | Cross-country | | | Jumping | | | | | | Total | |
| Athlete | Horse | Event | Dressage | | Cross-country | | | Qualifier | | | Final | | | Total | |
| Athlete | Horse | Event | Penalties | Rank | Penalties | Total | Rank | Penalties | Total | Rank | Penalties | Total | Rank | Penalties | Rank |
|---|---|---|---|---|---|---|---|---|---|---|---|---|---|---|---|
| Aoife Clark | Master Crusoe | Individual | 48.90 | 32 | 3.60 | 52.50 | 21 | 0.00 | 52.50 | 12 | 0.00 | 52.50 | 7 | 52.50 | 7 |
| Mark Kyle | Coolio | Individual | 58.70 | 61 | 7.20 | 65.90 | 35 | 6.00 | 71.90 | 32 | 4.00 | 75.90 | 21 | 75.90 | 21 |
| Joseph Murphy | Electric Cruise | Individual | 55.60 | 53 | 1.80 | 60.40 | 29 | 0.00 | 60.40 | 24 | 0.00 | 60.40 | 14 | 60.40 | 14 |
| Michael Ryan | Ballylynch Adventure | Individual | 60.20 | 64 | Eliminated | | | Did not advance | | | | | | | |
| Camilla Speirs | Portersize Just A Jiff | Individual | 47.60 | 27 | Eliminated | | | Did not advance | | | | | | | |
| Aoife Clark; Mark Kyle; Joseph Murphy; Michael Ryan; Camilla Speirs | See above | Team | 152.10 | 10 | 36.70 | 178.80 | 7 | 6.00 | 184.80 | 5 | —N/a | | | 184.80 | 5 |

=== Show jumping ===
| Athlete | Horse | Event | Qualification | | | | | | | | Final | | | | | Total | |
| Athlete | Horse | Event | Round 1 | | Round 2 | | | Round 3 | | | Round A | | Round B | | | Total | |
| Athlete | Horse | Event | Penalties | Rank | Penalties | Total | Rank | Penalties | Total | Rank | Penalties | Rank | Penalties | Total | Rank | Penalties | Rank |
|---|---|---|---|---|---|---|---|---|---|---|---|---|---|---|---|---|---|
| Cian O'Connor | Blue Loyd | Individual | 0 | 1 Q | 8 | 8 | 31 Q | 12 | 20 | 38 Q | 0 | 1 Q | 1 | 1 | 2 JO | 1 | 3rd place, bronze medalist(s) |
| Billy Twomey | Tinka | Individual | 4 | 42 Q | 8 | 12 | 56 | Did not advance | | | | | | | | | |

== Gymnastics ==
Ireland qualified a single gymnast for London; Kieran Behan, just the second Irish gymnast in history to qualify for the Olympics, competed in the artistic gymnastics discipline.

=== Artistic ===
Men

| Athlete | Event | Qualification | | | | | | | | Final | | | | | | | |
| Athlete | Event | Apparatus | | | | | | Total | Rank | Apparatus | | | | | | Total | Rank |
| Athlete | Event | F | PH | R | V | PB | HB | Total | Rank | F | PH | R | V | PB | HB | Total | Rank |
|---|---|---|---|---|---|---|---|---|---|---|---|---|---|---|---|---|---|
| Kieran Behan | Floor | 13.966 | —N/a | | | | | 13.966 | 53 | Did not advance | | | | | | | |

== Judo ==
| Athlete | Event | Round of 32 | Round of 16 | Quarterfinals | Semifinals | Repechage | Final / BM | |
| Athlete | Event | Opposition Result | Opposition Result | Opposition Result | Opposition Result | Opposition Result | Opposition Result | Rank |
|---|---|---|---|---|---|---|---|---|
| Lisa Kearney | Women's −48 kg | Bye | Wu Sg (CHN); L 0012–1011 | Did not advance | | | | |

== Modern pentathlon ==
Ireland qualified 2 athletes.

| Athlete | Event | Fencing (épée one touch) | | | Swimming (200 m freestyle) | | | Riding (show jumping) | | | Combined: shooting/running (10 m air pistol)/(3000 m) | | | Total points | Final rank |
| Athlete | Event | Results | Rank | MP points | Time | Rank | MP points | Penalties | Rank | MP points | Time | Rank | MP points | Total points | Final rank |
|---|---|---|---|---|---|---|---|---|---|---|---|---|---|---|---|
| Arthur Lanigan-O'Keeffe | Men's | 14–21 | 29 | 736 | 2:02.44 | 9 | 1332 | 80 | 20 | 1120 | 11:08.69 | 26 | 2328 | 5516 | 25 |
| Natalya Coyle | Women's | 19–16 | 11 | 856 | 2:19.17 | 20 | 1132 | 40 | 5 | 1160 | 12:12.45 | 13 | 2072 | 5220 | 9 |

== Rowing ==
Ireland qualified the following boats.

Women

| Athlete | Event | Heats | | Repechage | | Quarterfinals | | Semifinals | | Final | |
| Athlete | Event | Time | Rank | Time | Rank | Time | Rank | Time | Rank | Time | Rank |
|---|---|---|---|---|---|---|---|---|---|---|---|
| Sanita Pušpure | Single sculls | 7:49:35 | 3 QF | Bye | | 7:44:19 | 4 SC/D | 7:51.69 | 1 FC | 7:59.77 | 13 |

Qualification Legend: FA=Final A (medal); FB=Final B (non-medal); FC=Final C (non-medal); FD=Final D (non-medal); FE=Final E (non-medal); FF=Final F (non-medal); SA/B=Semifinals A/B; SC/D=Semifinals C/D; SE/F=Semifinals E/F; QF=Quarterfinals; R=Repechage

== Sailing ==
Ireland qualified 1 boat for each of the following events.

Men

| Athlete | Event | Race | | | | | | | | | | | Net points | Final rank |
| Athlete | Event | | 2 | 3 | 4 | 5 | 6 | 7 | 8 | 9 | 5 | M* | Net points | Final rank |
|---|---|---|---|---|---|---|---|---|---|---|---|---|---|---|
| James Espey | Laser | 38 | ~~44~~ | 39 | 36 | 46 | 42 | 27 | 27 | 25 | 35 | EL | 313 | 36 |
| Scott Flanigan; Ger Owens | 470 | 16 | 25 | 24 | 25 | 15 | 22 | 25 | ~~27~~ | 16 | 5 | EL | 173 | 23 |
| David Burrows; Peter O'Leary | Star | 2 | 6 | ~~14~~ | 5 | 11 | 12 | 9 | 7 | 11 | 7 | 20 | 95 | 10 |

Women

| Athlete | Event | Race | | | | | | | | | | | Net points | Final rank |
| Athlete | Event | 1 | 2 | 3 | 4 | 5 | 6 | 7 | 8 | 9 | 10 | M* | Net points | Final rank |
|---|---|---|---|---|---|---|---|---|---|---|---|---|---|---|
| Annalise Murphy | Laser Radial | 1 | 1 | 1 | 1 | 8 | ~~19~~ | 2 | 10 | 3 | 7 | 5 | 44 | 4 |

Open

| Athlete | Event | Race | | | | | | | | | | | | | | | | Net points | Final rank |
| Athlete | Event | 1 | 2 | 3 | 4 | 5 | 6 | 7 | 8 | 9 | 10 | 11 | 12 | 13 | 14 | 15 | M* | Net points | Final rank |
|---|---|---|---|---|---|---|---|---|---|---|---|---|---|---|---|---|---|---|---|
| Matt McGovern; Ryan Seaton | 49er | 4 | 8 | 15 | 2 | 12 | ~~19~~ | 11 | 9 | 14 | 7 | 15 | 7 | 13 | 16 | 16 | EL | 149 | 14 |

M = Medal race; EL = Eliminated – did not advance into the medal race;

== Shooting ==
Men

| Athlete | Event | Qualification | | Final | |
| Athlete | Event | Points | Rank | Points | Rank |
|---|---|---|---|---|---|
| Derek Burnett | Trap | 116 | 27 | did not advance | |

== Swimming ==
Irish swimmers achieved qualifying standards in the following events (up to a maximum of 2 swimmers in each event at the Olympic Qualifying Time (OQT), and 1 at the Olympic Selection Time (OST)):

Men

| Athlete | Event | Heat | | Semifinal | | Final | |
| Athlete | Event | Time | Rank | Time | Rank | Time | Rank |
|---|---|---|---|---|---|---|---|
| Barry Murphy | 50 m freestyle | 22.76 | 29 | Did not advance | | | |
| Barry Murphy | 100 m breaststroke | 1:01.57 | 29 | Did not advance | | | |

Qualifiers for the latter rounds (Q) of all events were decided on a time only basis, therefore positions shown are overall results versus competitors in all heats.

Women

| Athlete | Event | Heat | | Semifinal | | Final | |
| Athlete | Event | Time | Rank | Time | Rank | Time | Rank |
|---|---|---|---|---|---|---|---|
| Sycerika McMahon | 100 m breaststroke | 1:08.80 | 26 | Did not advance | | | |
| Sycerika McMahon | 200 m individual medley | 2:14.76 | 22 | Did not advance | | | |
| Gráinne Murphy | 200 m freestyle | DNS | | Did not advance | | | |
| Gráinne Murphy | 400 m freestyle | 4:19.07 | 31 | —N/a | | Did not advance | |
| Gráinne Murphy | 800 m freestyle | DNS | | —N/a | | Did not advance | |
| Gráinne Murphy | 400 m individual medley | DNS | | —N/a | | Did not advance | |
| Melanie Nocher | 100 m backstroke | 1:02.44 | 33 | Did not advance | | | |
| Melanie Nocher | 200 m backstroke | 2:16.29 | 34 | Did not advance | | | |

Qualifiers for the latter rounds (Q) of all events were decided on a time only basis, therefore positions shown are overall results versus competitors in all heats.

== Triathlon ==
Ireland qualified the following athletes.

| Athlete | Event | Swim (1.5 km) | Trans 1 | Bike (40 km) | Trans 2 | Run (10 km) | Total Time | Rank |
|---|---|---|---|---|---|---|---|---|
| Gavin Noble | Men's | 17:24 | 18:01 | 58:50 | 1:17:21 | 32:26 | 1:49:47 | 23 |
| Aileen Morrison | Women's | 19:36 | 20:17 | 1:31:16 | 1:31:52 | 38:08 | 2:08:16 | 43 |

== See also ==
- Ireland at the 2012 Winter Youth Olympics
