= Cuddihy =

Cuddihy is a surname. Notable people with the surname include:

- Barry Cuddihy (born 1996), Scottish footballer
- Caitriona Cuddihy (born 1986), Irish athlete
- Joanne Cuddihy (born 1984), Irish sprint athlete
- John Murray Cuddihy (1922–2011), American sociologist
- Tim Cuddihy (born 1987), Australian archer
