= Giai (name) =

Giai is a Vietnamese given name and an Italian surname originated in the region of Piedmont. Notable people with the name include:

== Given names ==
- Đỗ Kế Giai (1929–2016), South Vietnamese major general
- Đỗ Quang Giai (1900–1972), South Vietnamese senator
- Vũ Văn Giai (1934–2012), South Vietnamese general

== Surnames ==
- Cristina Giai Pron (born 1974), Italian slalom canoeist
- Giovanni Antonio Giai (also spelled as Giay) (1690–1764), Italian composer
- Maria Clara Giai Pron (born 1992), Italian slalom canoeist, younger sister of Cristina

Source: https://olympics.com/en/athletes/maria-clara-giai-pron
