= Samlal =

Samlal is a surname. Notable people with the surname include:

- Jihane Samlal (born 1983), Moroccan slalom canoer
- Nizar Samlal (born 1979), Moroccan slalom canoer
