= 2012 European Cross Country Championships =

- Organisers: EAA
- Edition: 19th
- Date: 9 December
- Host city: Szentendre, Hungary
- Events: 6
- Distances: 9.880 km – Men; 8.050 km – Women; 8.050 km – U23 men 6.025 km – U23 women 6.025 km – Junior men 4.000 km – Junior women

The 2012 European Cross Country Championships was the 19th edition of the cross country running competition for European athletes which was held in Szentendre, Hungary on 9 December.

Andrea Lalli of Italy won the men's title to become the country's first champion at the competition. The men's team race was won by Spain. Fionnuala Britton was the winner in the senior women's race, becoming the first woman to retain her title. Team Ireland took gold in the senior women's race.

== Race results ==
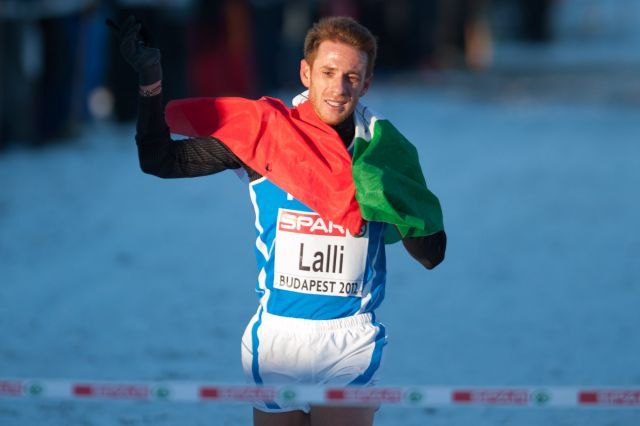
Andrea Lalli became the first Italian to win the competition.

=== Senior men ===
Individual race
Rank	Athlete	Country	Time (m:s)
Gold medal	Andrea Lalli	Italy	30:01
Silver medal	Hassan Chahdi	France	30:11
Bronze medal	Daniele Meucci	Italy	30:13
4	Tom Farrell	Great Britain	30:14
5	Carles Castillejo	Spain	30:14
6	Ayad Lamdassem	Spain	30:14
7	Polat Kemboi Arıkan	Turkey	30:21
8	Javier Guerra	Spain	30:22
9	Bashir Abdi	Belgium	30:26
10	Steve Vernon	Great Britain	30:28
11	Jonathan Taylor	Great Britain	30:30
12	Milan Kocourek	Czech Republic	30:33

Teams
Rank	Team	Points
Gold medal	Spain; Carles Castillejo; Ayad Lamdassem; Javier Guerra; Juan Carlos Higuero; Antonio Dávid Jiménez	35
Silver medal	Great Britain; Tom Farrell; Steve Vernon; Jonathan Taylor; Andy Vernon; Tom Humphries	38
Bronze medal	Italy; Andrea Lalli; Daniele Meucci; Gabriele De Nard; Patrick Nasti; Alex Baldaccini	63

- Totals: 92 entrants, 92 starters, 84 finishers, 8 teams.

=== Senior women ===
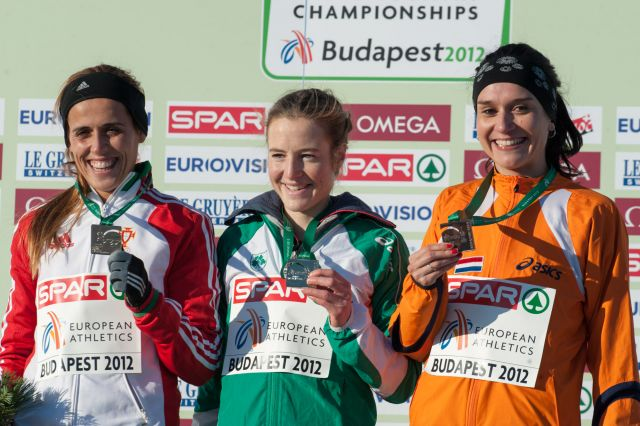
The Women's podium

Individual race
Rank	Athlete	Country	Time (m:s)
Gold medal	Fionnuala Britton	Ireland	27:45
Silver medal	Ana Dulce Félix	Portugal	27:47
Bronze medal	Adrienne Herzog	Netherlands	27:48
4	Almensh Belete	Belgium	27:54
5	Laurane Picoche	France	27:55
6	Sophie Duarte	France	27:55
7	Nadia Ejjafini	Italy	27:59
8	Linda Byrne	Ireland	28:17
9	Lisa Stublić	Croatia	28:18
10	Diana Martín	Spain	28:19
11	Louise Damen	Great Britain	28:22
12	Sara Moreira	Portugal	28:26

Teams
Rank	Team	Points
Gold medal	Ireland; Fionnuala Britton; Linda Byrne; Ava Hutchinson; Lizzie Lee; Sarah McCormack	52
Silver medal	France; Laurane Picoche; Sophie Duarte; Christine Bardelle; Magali Bernard; Maryline Pellen	52
Bronze medal	Great Britain; Louise Damen; Caryl Jones; Rosie Smith; Elle Baker; Katrina Wootton	60

- Totals: 54 entrants, 54 starters, 54 finishers, 8 teams.

=== Under-23 men ===
Individual race
Rank	Athlete	Country	Time (m:s)
Gold medal	Henrik Ingebrigtsen	Norway	24:30
Silver medal	Soufiane Bouchikhi	Belgium	24:40
Bronze medal	James Wilkinson	Great Britain	24:43
4	Jesper van der Wielen	Netherlands	24:46
5	Romain Collenot-Spiret	France	24:50
6	Antonio Abadía	Spain	24:57
7	Abdelaziz Merzougui	Spain	24:57
8	Hayle Ibrahimov	Azerbaijan	24:59
9	Ørjan Grønnevig	Norway	25:00
10	Simon Denissel	France	25:02
11	Abdi Hakin Ulad	Denmark	25:04
12	Lars Erik Malde	Norway	25:05

Teams
Rank	Team	Points
Gold medal	France; Romain Collenot-Spiret; Simon Denissel; Michael Gras; Matthieu Lonjou; Tanguy Pepiot	50
Silver medal	Spain; Antonio Abadía; Abdelaziz Merzougui; Roberto Alaiz; Aitor Fernández; Gabriel Navarro	59
Bronze medal	Great Britain; James Wilkinson; Andrew Heyes; Simon Horsfield; Dewi Griffiths; Scott McDonald	80

- Totals: 99 entrants, 99 starters, 94 finishers, 15 teams.

=== Under-23 women ===
Individual race
Rank	Athlete	Country	Time (m:s)
Gold medal	Jess Coulson	Great Britain	20:40
Silver medal	Lyudmila Lebedeva	Russia	20:49
Bronze medal	Clémence Calvin	France	20:52
4	Gulshat Fazlitdinova	Russia	20:52
5	Lauren Howarth	Great Britain	20:56
6	Corinna Harrer	Germany	21:04
7	Carla Salomé Rocha	Portugal	21:05
8	Yekaterina Matyunina	Russia	21:07
9	Viktoriya Pohoryelska	Ukraine	21:08
10	Catarina Ribeiro	Portugal	21:20
11	Layes Abdullayeva	Azerbaijan	21:23
12	Hannah Walker	Great Britain	21:27

Teams
Rank	Team	Points
Gold medal	Russia; Lyudmila Lebedeva; Gulshat Fazlitdinova; Yekaterina Matyunina; Yelena Sedova	27
Silver medal	Great Britain; Jess Coulson; Lauren Howarth; Hannah Walker; Lily Partridge; Beth Potter; Hannah Alderson	33
Bronze medal	Germany; Corinna Harrer; Jana Sussmann; Melanie Stemper; Domenika Weiss; Jannika John	86

- Totals: 63 entrants, 63 starters, 63 finishers, 6 teams.

=== Junior men ===
Individual race
Rank	Athlete	Country	Time (m:s)
Gold medal	Szymon Kulka	Poland	18:43
Silver medal	Mitko Tsenov	Bulgaria	18:47
Bronze medal	Kieran Clements	Great Britain	18:57
4	Ferdinand Kvan Edman	Norway	18:59
5	Djilali Bedrani	France	18:59
6	Isaac Kimeli	Belgium	19:00
7	Alexandre Saddedine	France	19:00
8	Dino Bošnjak	Croatia	19:01
9	Charlie Grice	Great Britain	19:02
10	Viktor Bakharev	Russia	19:03
11	Mikhail Strelkov	Russia	19:04
12	Johannes Motschmann	Germany	19:10

Teams
Rank	Team	Points
Gold medal	Russia; Viktor Bakharev; Mikhail Strelkov; Nikita Vysotskiy; Rudolf Petrukhin; Ivan Panferov; Aleksandr Novikov	50
Silver medal	France; Djilali Bedrani; Alexandre Saddedine; Emmanuel Roudolff Levisse; Hamza Habjaoui; Félix Bour	51
Bronze medal	Great Britain; Kieran Clements; Charlie Grice; Ian Bailey; Charlie Hulson; Luke Traynor	54

- Totals: 116 entrants, 116 starters, 114 finishers, 19 teams.

=== Junior women ===
Individual race
Rank	Athlete	Country	Time (m:s)
Gold medal	Amela Terzić	Serbia	13:29
Silver medal	Emelia Gorecka	Great Britain	13:37
Bronze medal	Maya Rehberg	Germany	13:43
4	Maruša Mišmaš	Slovenia	13:44
5	Annabel Mason	Great Britain	13:47
6	Ummuhani Karacadir	Turkey	13:54
7	Mariya Hodakyvska	Ukraine	14:00
8	Jenny Walsh	Great Britain	14:01
9	Monica Florea	Romania	14:04
10	Yevdokiya Bukina	Russia	14:05
11	Luiza Litvinova	Russia	14:07
12	Liv Westphal	France	14:08

Teams
Rank	Team	Points
Gold medal	Great Britain; Emelia Gorecka; Annabel Mason; Jenny Walsh; Jessica Judd; Alex Clay; Rhona Auckland	28
Silver medal	Germany; Maya Rehberg; Anna Gehring; Caterina Granz; Johanna Schulz; Lisa Ziegler; Laura Clart	106
Bronze medal	Russia; Yevdokiya Bukina; Luiza Litvinova; Zulfira Fazlitdinova; Alena Shukhtuyeva	111

- Totals: 94 entrants, 94 starters, 93 finishers, 16 teams.

== Medal table ==
Rank	Nation	Gold	Silver	Bronze	Total
1	Great Britain (GBR)	2	3	5	10
2	Russia (RUS)	2	1	1	4
3	Ireland (IRL)	2	0	0	2
4	France (FRA)	1	3	1	5
5	Spain (ESP)	1	1	0	2
6	Italy (ITA)	1	0	2	3
7	Norway (NOR)	1	0	0	1
7	Poland (POL)	1	0	0	1
7	Serbia (SRB)	1	0	0	1
10	Germany (GER)	0	1	2	3
11	Belgium (BEL)	0	1	0	1
11	Bulgaria (BUL)	0	1	0	1
11	Portugal (POR)	0	1	0	1
14	Netherlands (NED)	0	0	1	1
Totals (14 entries)		12	12	12	36
