= Canoeing at the 2012 Summer Olympics – Women's slalom K-1 =

Women's K-1 canoe slalom at the Games of the XXX Olympiad
- Venue: Lee Valley White Water Centre
- Date: 30 July – 2 August
- Competitors: 21 from 21 nations
- Winning time: 105.90

Medalists
| 1st place, gold medalist(s) | | Émilie Fer | France |
| 2nd place, silver medalist(s) | | Jessica Fox | Australia |
| 3rd place, bronze medalist(s) | | Maialen Chourraut | Spain |

The women's K-1 canoe slalom competition at the 2012 Olympic Games in London took place between 30 July and 2 August at the Lee Valley White Water Centre.

The gold medal was won by Émilie Fer from France.

== Competition format ==
In the heats, each competitor had two runs; the 15 athletes with the best time qualified for the semi-finals. Each semi-final consisted of one run each and the best 10 qualified for the final. The final was also one run where the canoeist with the best time won the gold medal.

== Schedule ==
All times are British Summer Time (UTC+01:00)

| Date | Time | Round |
|---|---|---|
| Monday 30 July 2012 | 14:12 & 16:24 | Heats |
| Thursday 2 August 2012 | 14:12 | Semi-final |
| Thursday 2 August 2012 | 15:57 | Final |

1st gate set, preliminary heats, July 29, 30.

2nd gate set, semi- & finals, July 31, August 1, 2.

== Results ==
| Order | Name | Preliminary Heats | | | | | | Semifinal | | | Final | | |
| Order | Name | 1st Ride | Pen. | 2nd Ride | Pen. | Best | Order | Time | Pen. | Order | Time | Pen. | Order |
|---|---|---|---|---|---|---|---|---|---|---|---|---|---|
| 1st place, gold medalist(s) | Émilie Fer (FRA) | 112.77 | 4 | 106.46 | 6 | 106.46 | 10 | 109.73 | 0 | 3 | 105.90 | 0 | 1 |
| 2nd place, silver medalist(s) | Jessica Fox (AUS) | 165.36 | 52 | 100.33 | 0 | 100.33 | 4 | 112.63 | 4 | 8 | 106.51 | 0 | 2 |
| 3rd place, bronze medalist(s) | Maialen Chourraut (ESP) | 98.75 | 2 | 107.91 | 2 | 98.75 | 1 | 108.34 | 2 | 2 | 106.87 | 0 | 3 |
| 4 | Štěpánka Hilgertová (CZE) | 101.50 | 0 | 100.75 | 0 | 100.75 | 5 | 114.10 | 0 | 9 | 109.16 | 0 | 4 |
| 5 | Jasmin Schornberg (GER) | 106.27 | 0 | 102.14 | 4 | 102.14 | 8 | 112.25 | 0 | 7 | 110.97 | 0 | 5 |
| 6 | Jana Dukátová (SVK) | 105.14 | 4 | 101.37 | 4 | 101.37 | 6 | 110.48 | 0 | 4 | 111.60 | 2 | 6 |
| 7 | Natalia Pacierpnik (POL) | 110.58 | 2 | 102.38 | 0 | 102.38 | 9 | 107.79 | 2 | 1 | 115.08 | 2 | 7 |
| 8 | Corinna Kuhnle (AUT) | 160.06 | 50 | 101.77 | 2 | 101.77 | 7 | 111.07 | 2 | 5 | 119.30 | 2 | 8 |
| 9 | Marta Kharitonova (RUS) | 108.85 | 4 | 109.77 | 2 | 108.85 | 13 | 111.44 | 2 | 6 | 120.91 | 6 | 9 |
| 10 | Hannah Craig (IRL) | 117.07 | 8 | 108.99 | 2 | 108.99 | 14 | 116.12 | 2 | 10 | 127.36 | 6 | 10 |
| 11 | Li Jingjing (CHN) | 108.53 | 2 | 111.22 | 6 | 108.53 | 12 | 117.02 | 4 | 11 | did not advance | | |
| 12 | Lizzie Neave (GBR) | 101.95 | 0 | 98.92 | 0 | 98.92 | 2 | 117.30 | 6 | 12 | did not advance | | |
| 13 | Eva Terčelj (SLO) | 107.17 | 2 | 107.57 | 4 | 107.17 | 11 | 117.36 | 6 | 13 | did not advance | | |
| 14 | Luuka Jones (NZL) | 109.23 | 6 | 258.69 | 152 | 109.23 | 15 | 121.41 | 4 | 14 | did not advance | | |
| 15 | Maria Clara Giai Pron (ITA) | 99.66 | 0 | 112.65 | 8 | 99.66 | 3 | 176.61 | 52 | 15 | did not advance | | |
| 16 | Ana Sátila (BRA) | 179.92 | 56 | 110.83 | 2 | 110.83 | 16 | did not advance | | | | | |
| 17 | Caroline Queen (USA) | 117.05 | 2 | 136.23 | 4 | 117.05 | 17 | did not advance | | | | | |
| 18 | Ella Nicholas (COK) | 118.69 | 4 | 118.29 | 4 | 118.29 | 18 | did not advance | | | | | |
| 19 | Moe Kaifuchi (JPN) | 171.63 | 50 | 121.29 | 6 | 121.29 | 19 | did not advance | | | | | |
| 20 | Elise Chabbey (SUI) | 162.92 | 50 | 126.46 | 6 | 124.46 | 20 | did not advance | | | | | |
| 21 | Jihane Samlal (MAR) | 174.09 | 60 | 276.32 | 156 | 174.09 | 21 | did not advance | | | | | |

=== Gallery ===
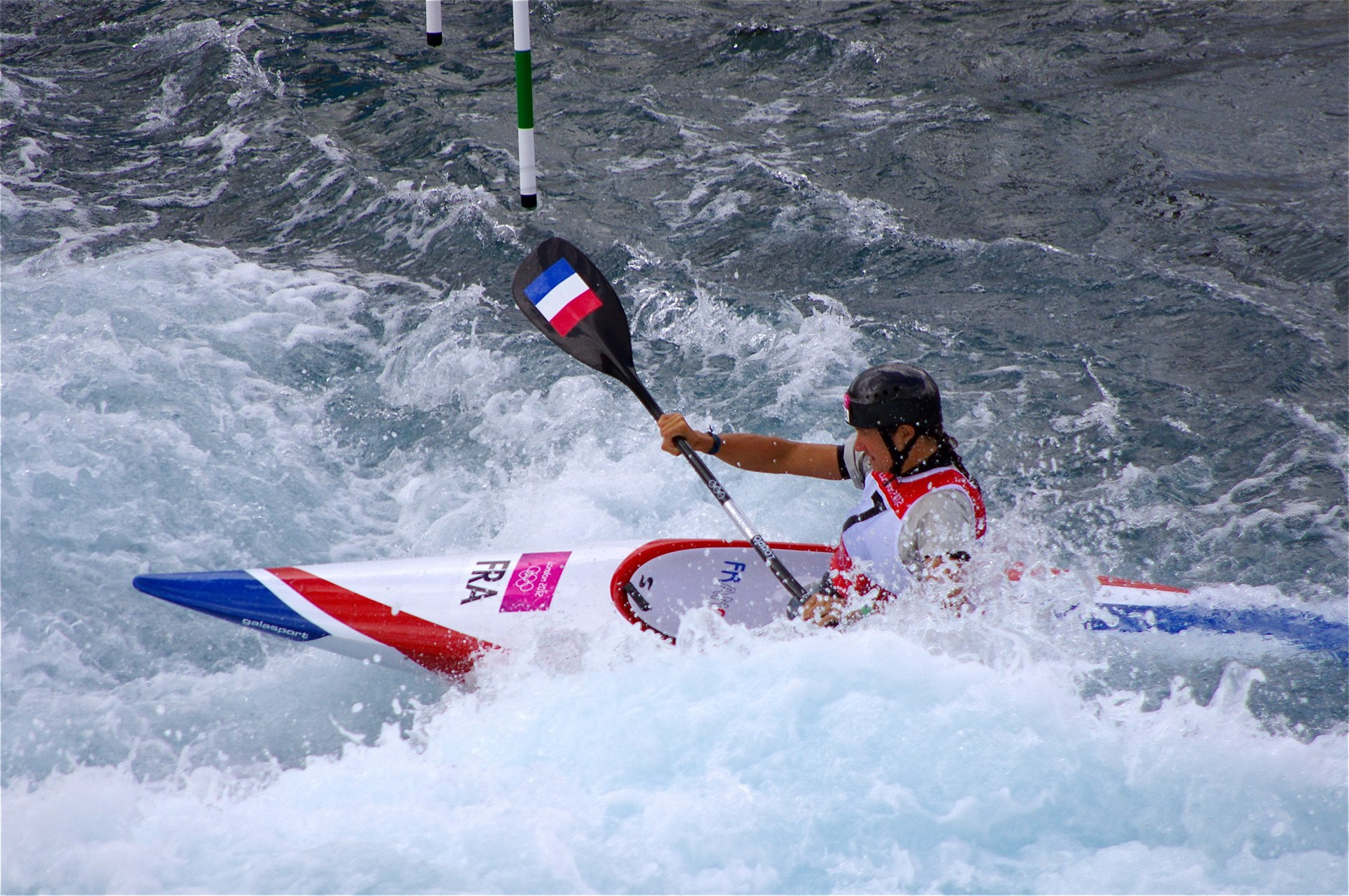
Émilie Fer

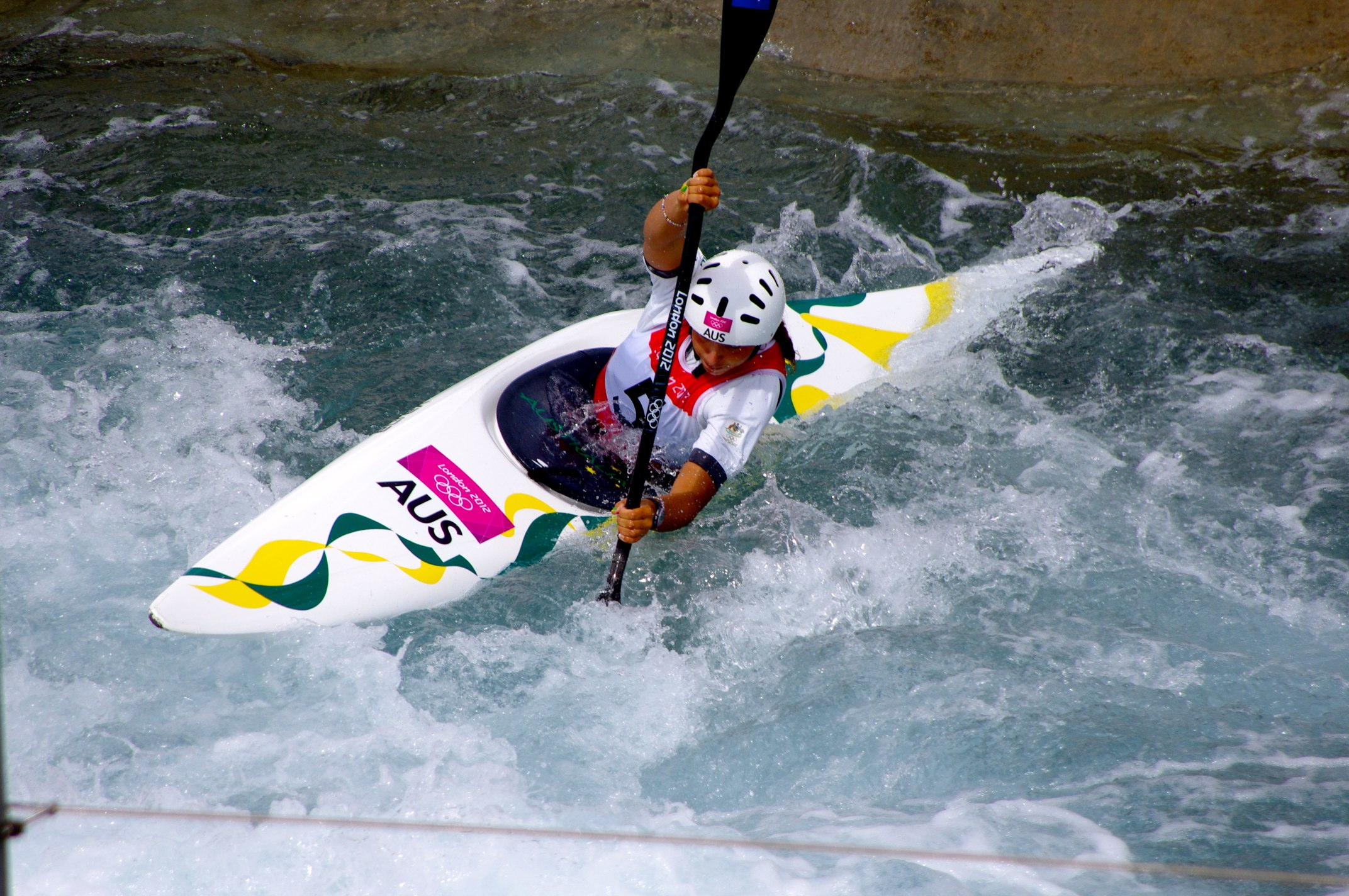
Jessica Fox

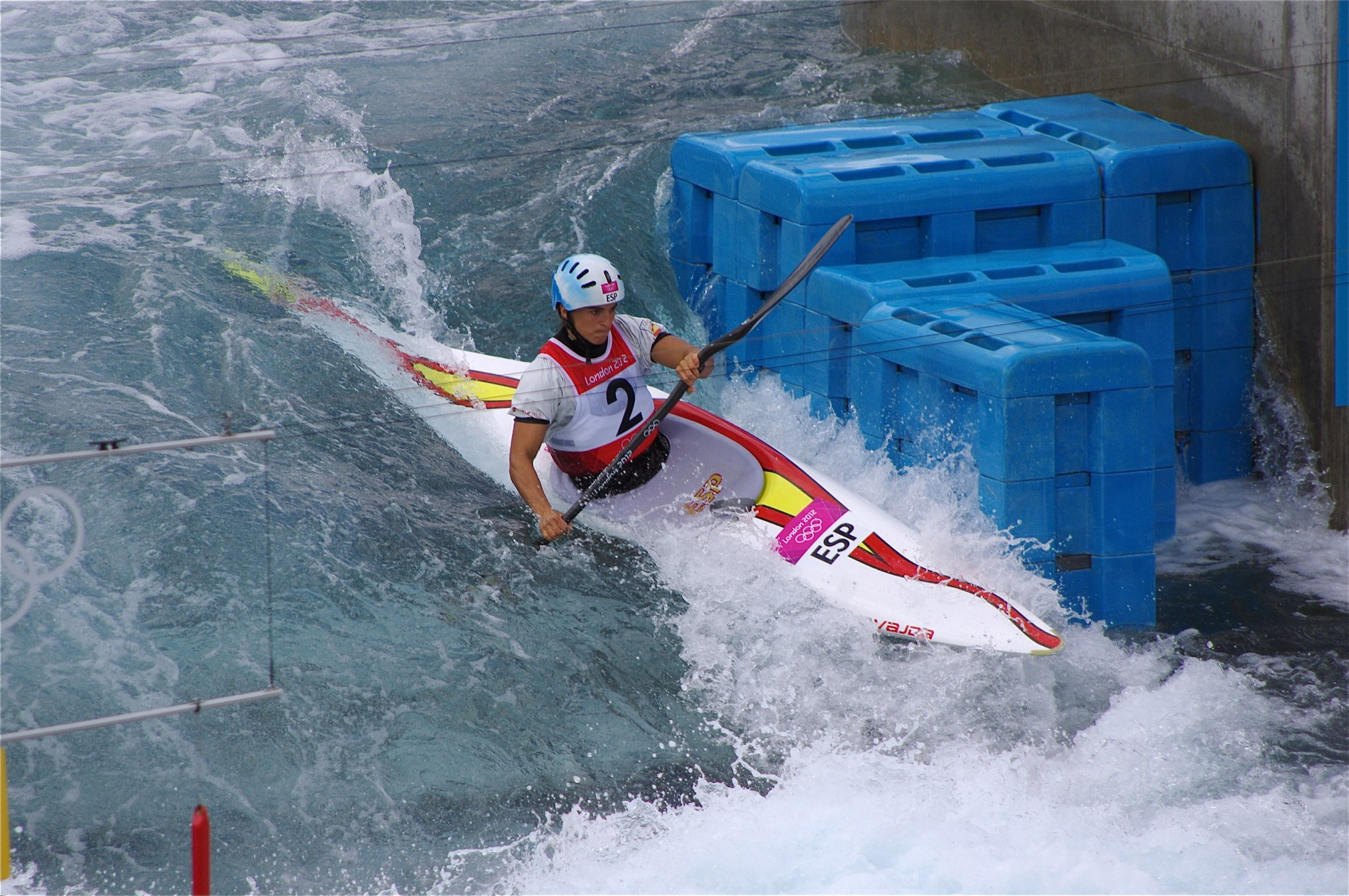
Maialen Chourraut

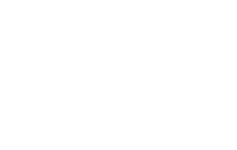
Štěpánka Hilgertová

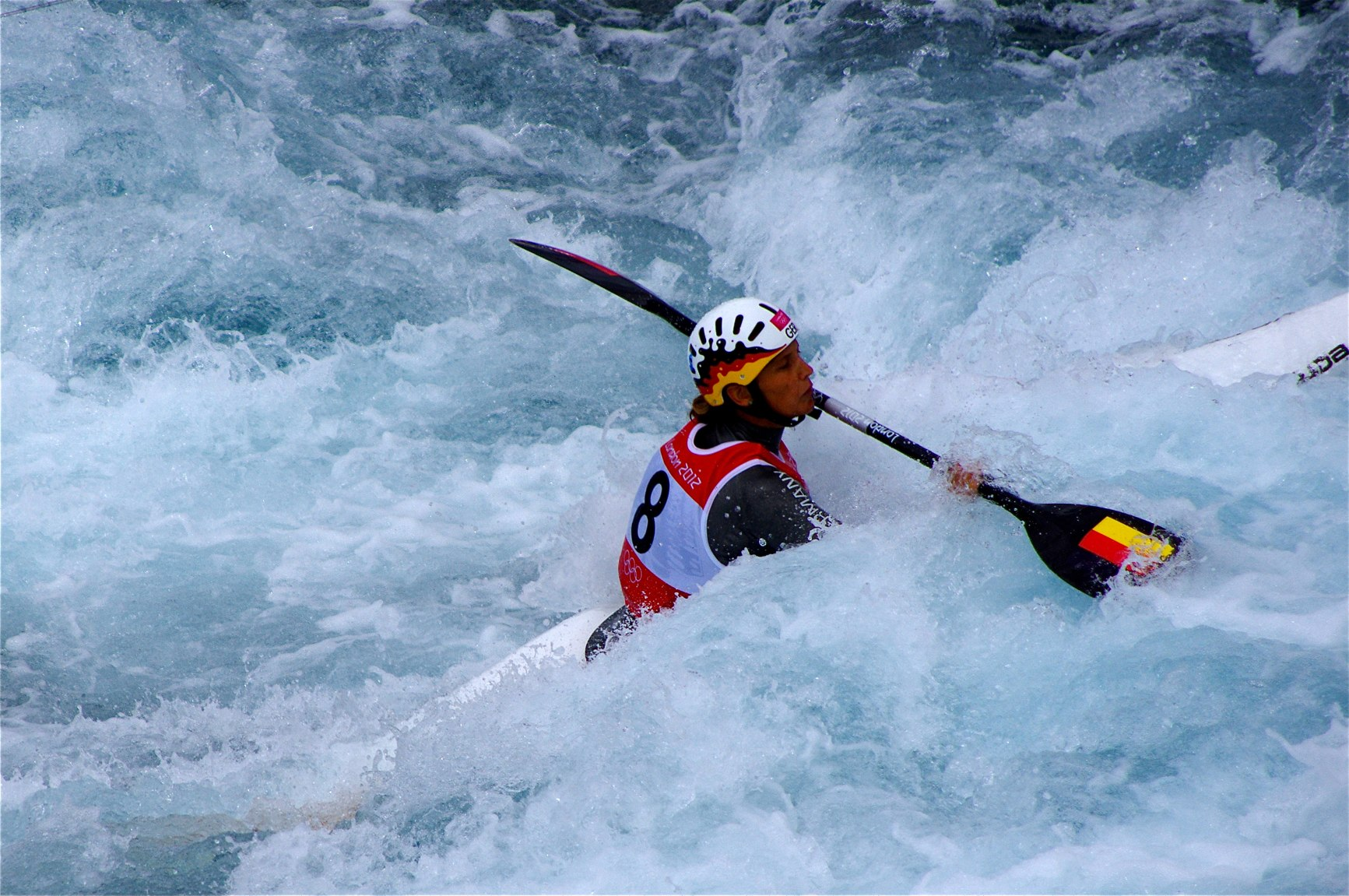
Jasmin Schornberg

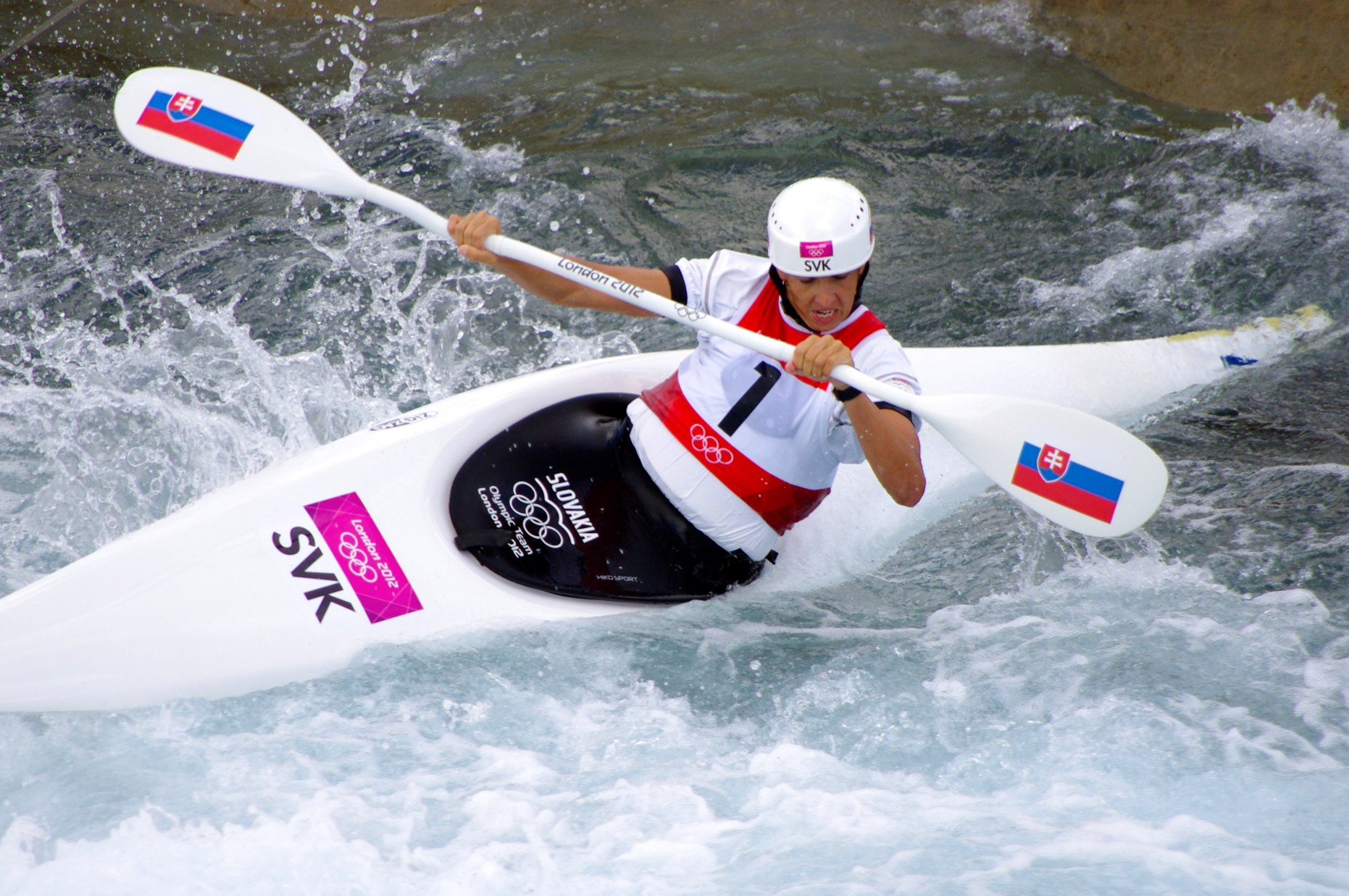
Jana Dukátová

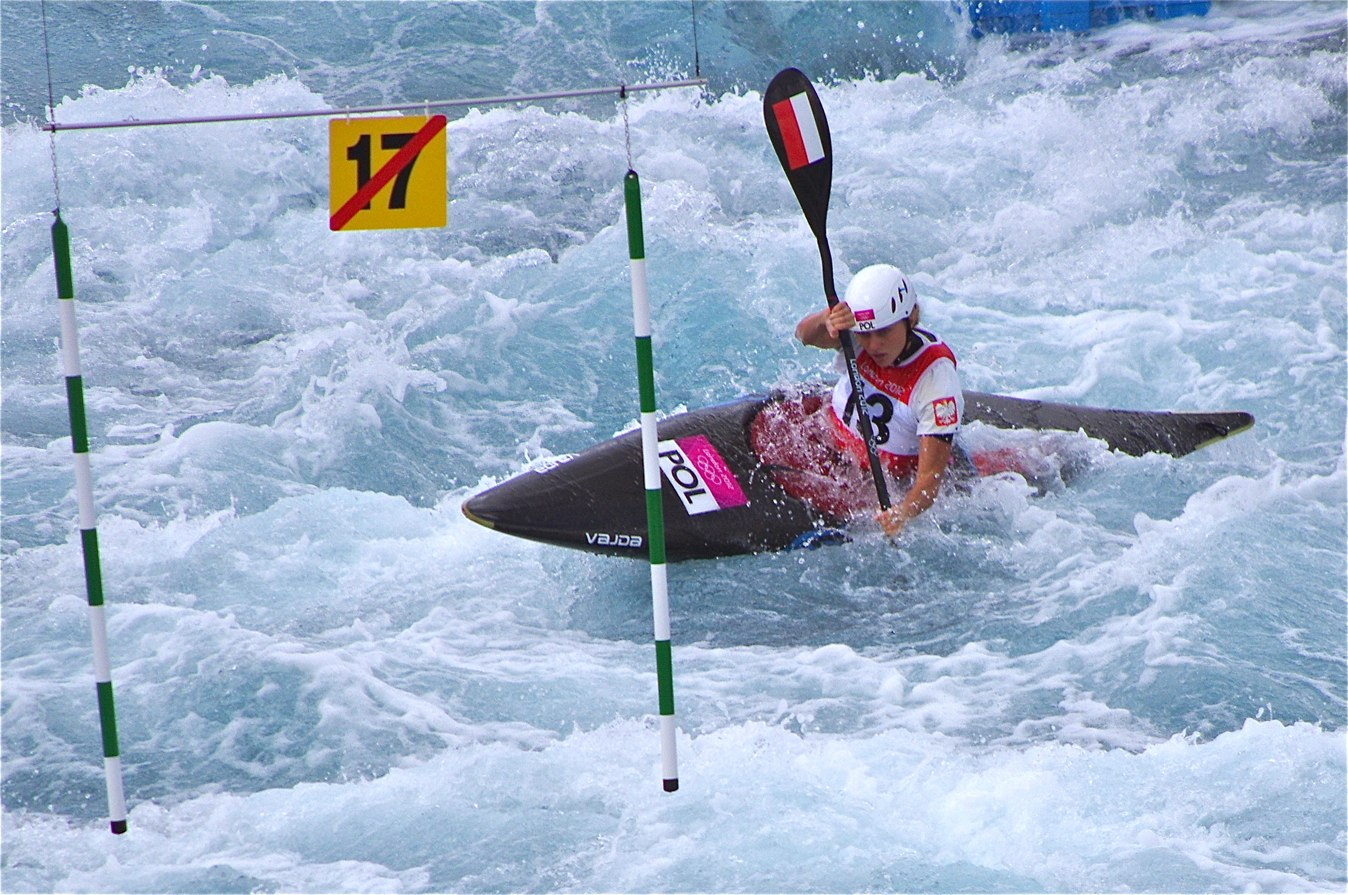
Natalia Pacierpnik

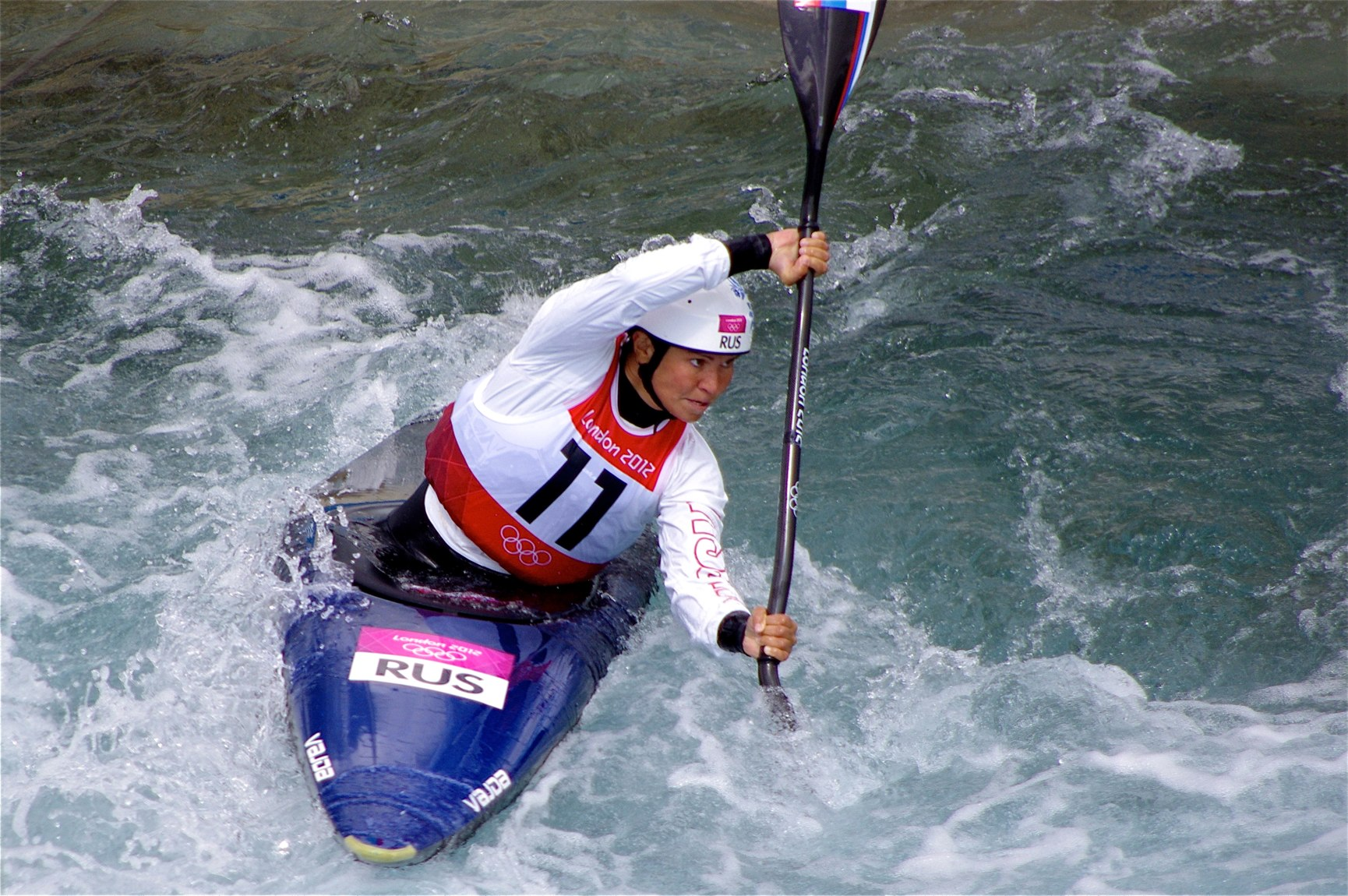
Marta Kharitonova

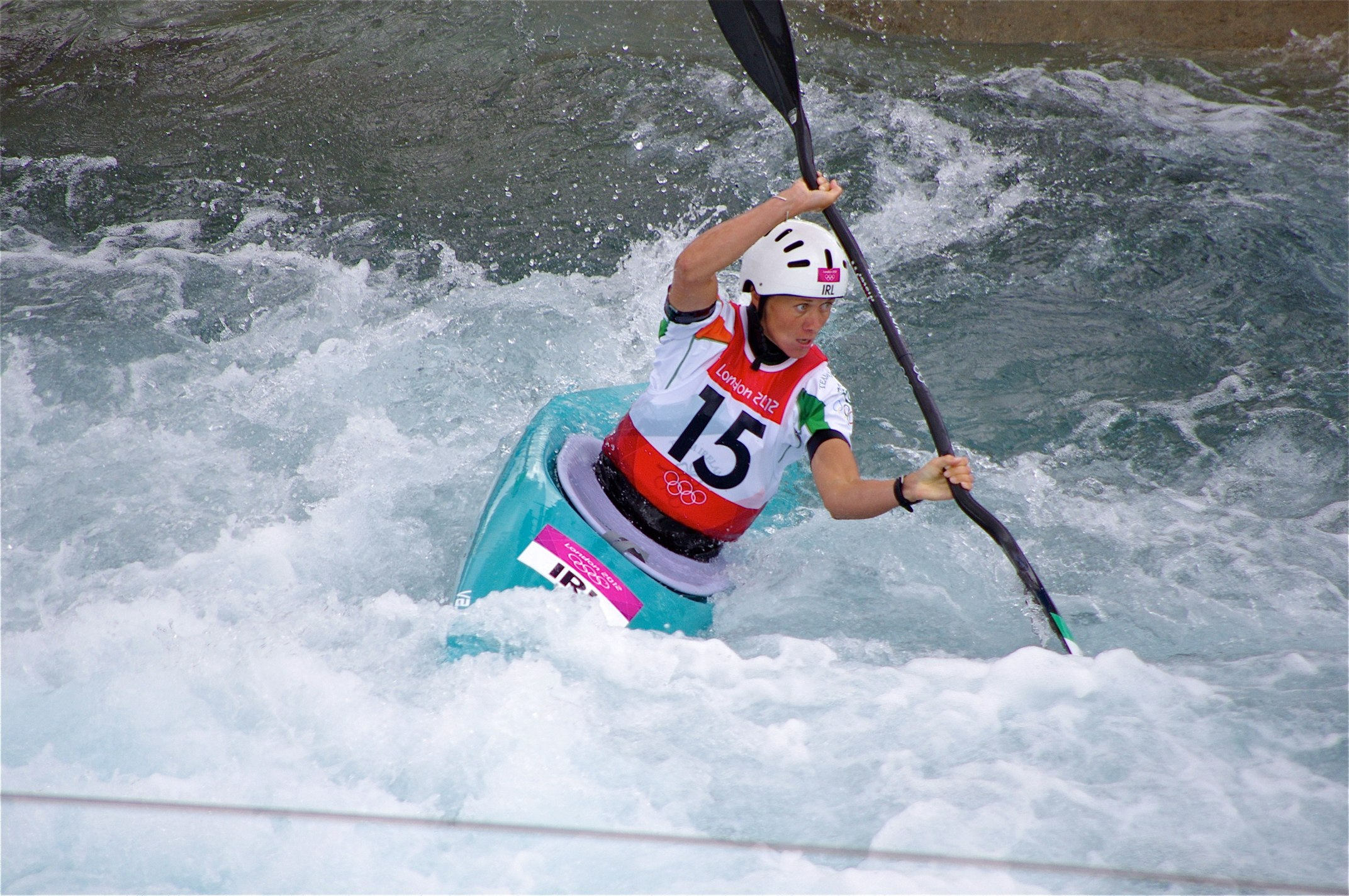
Hannah Craig

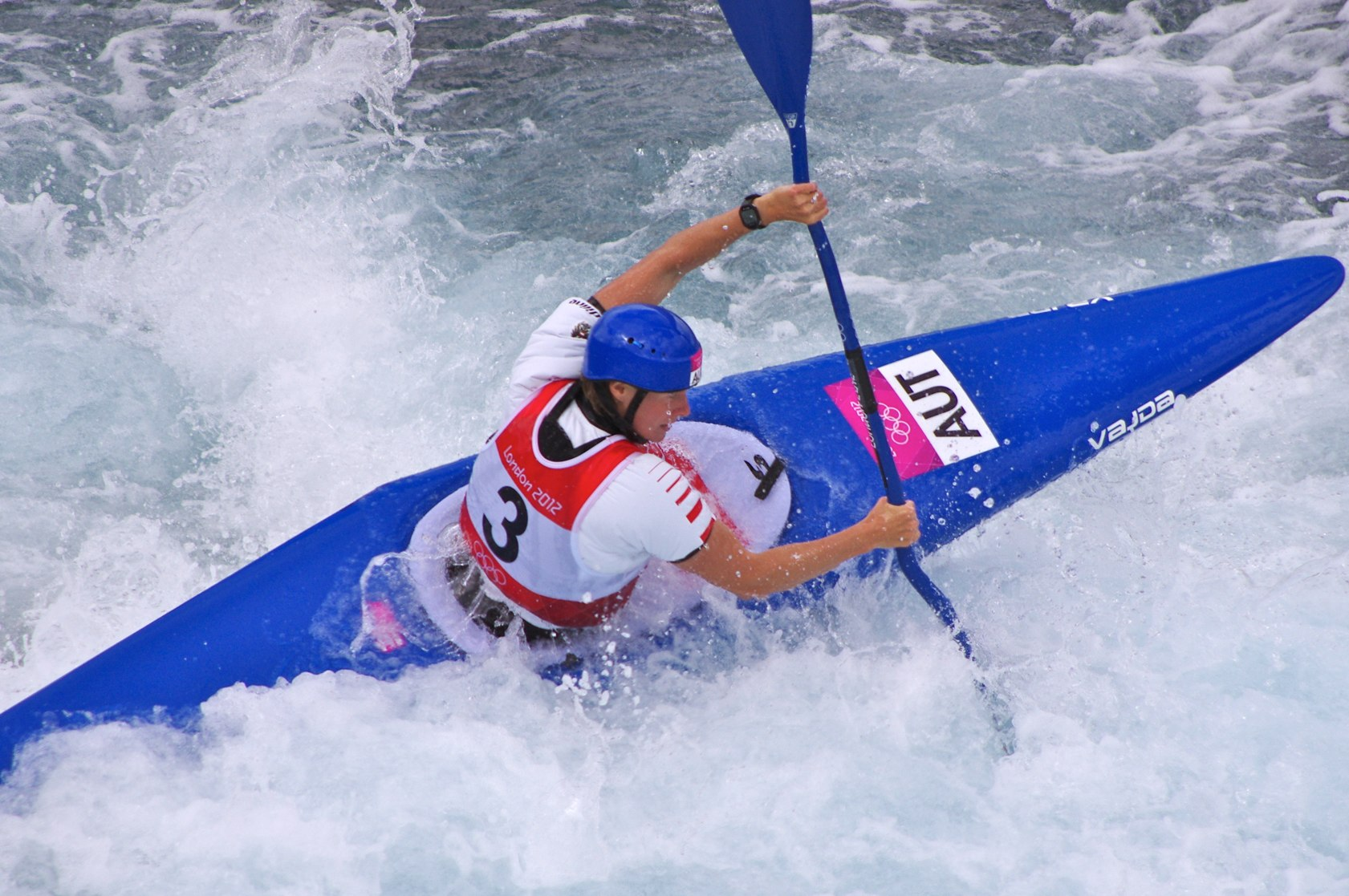
Corinna Kuhnle

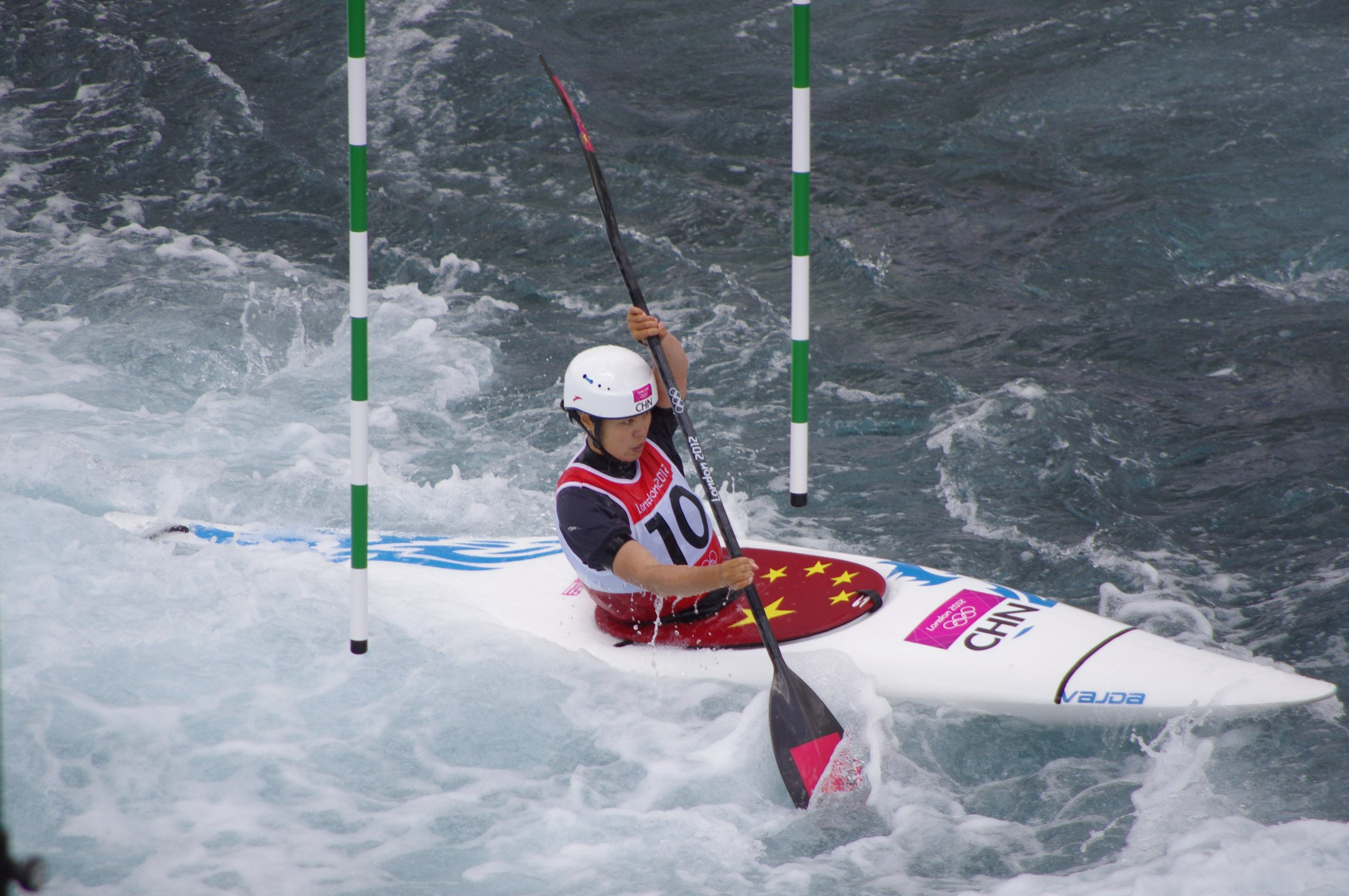
Li Jingjing

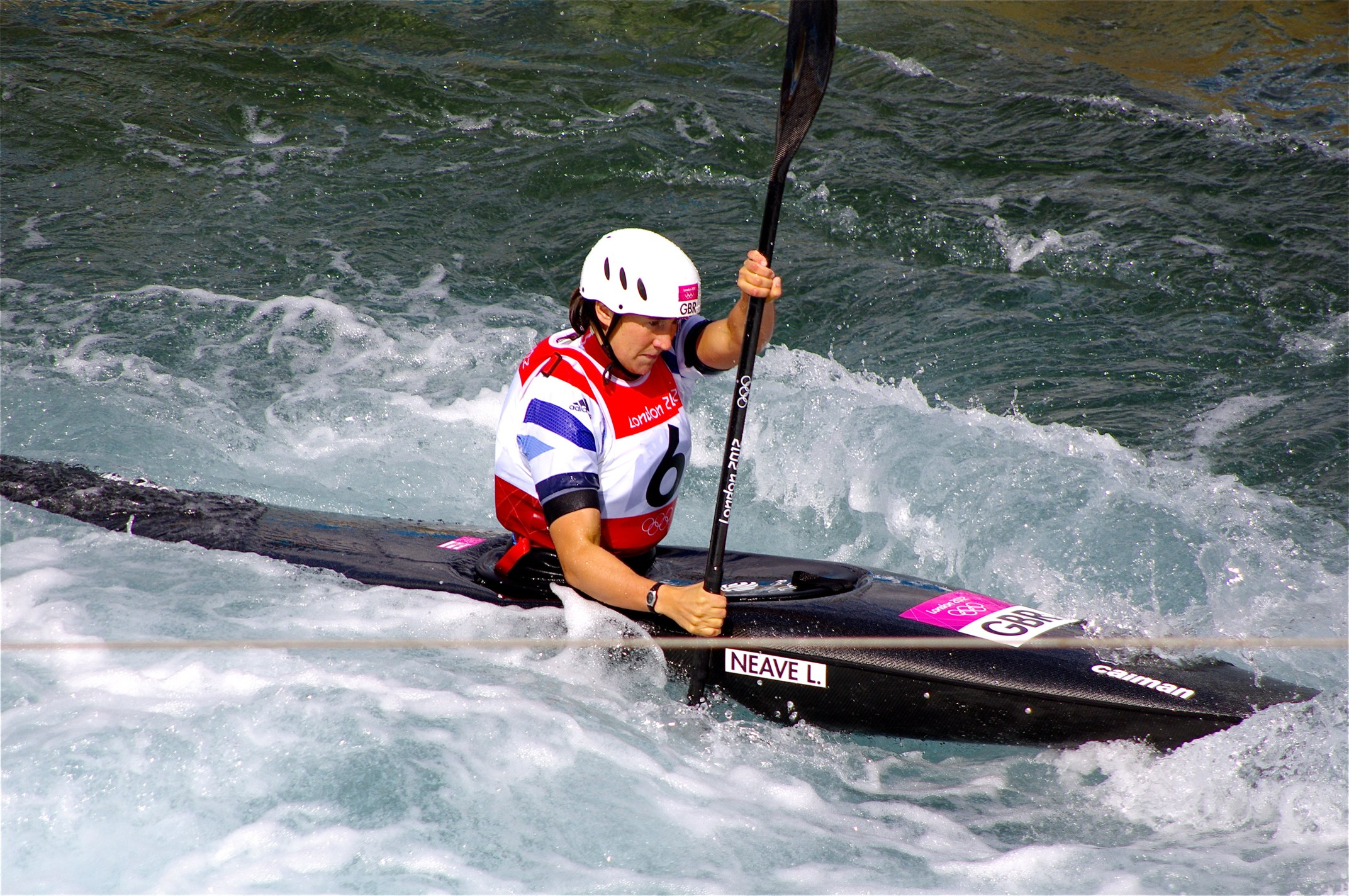
Lizzie Neave

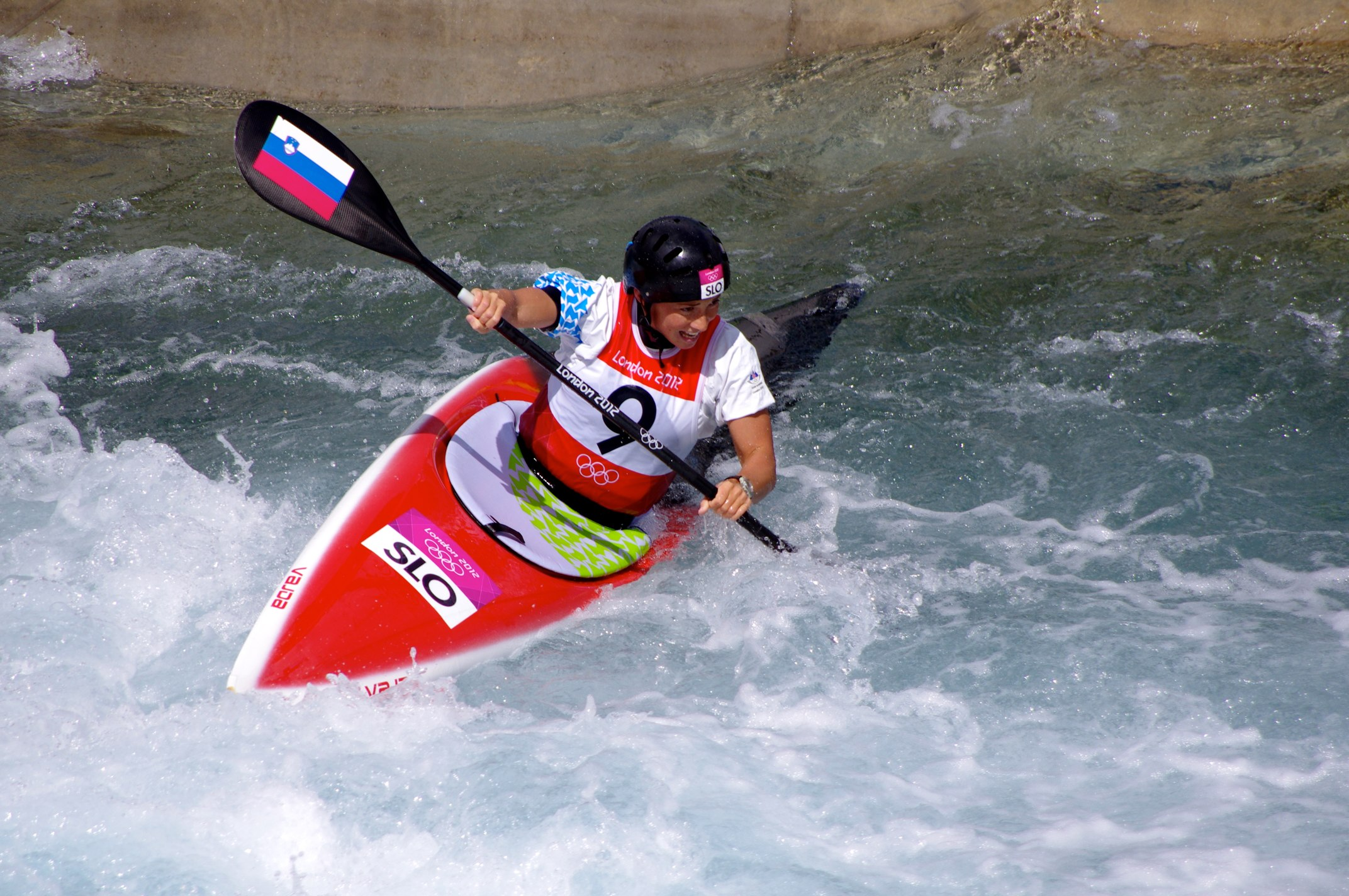
Eva Terčelj

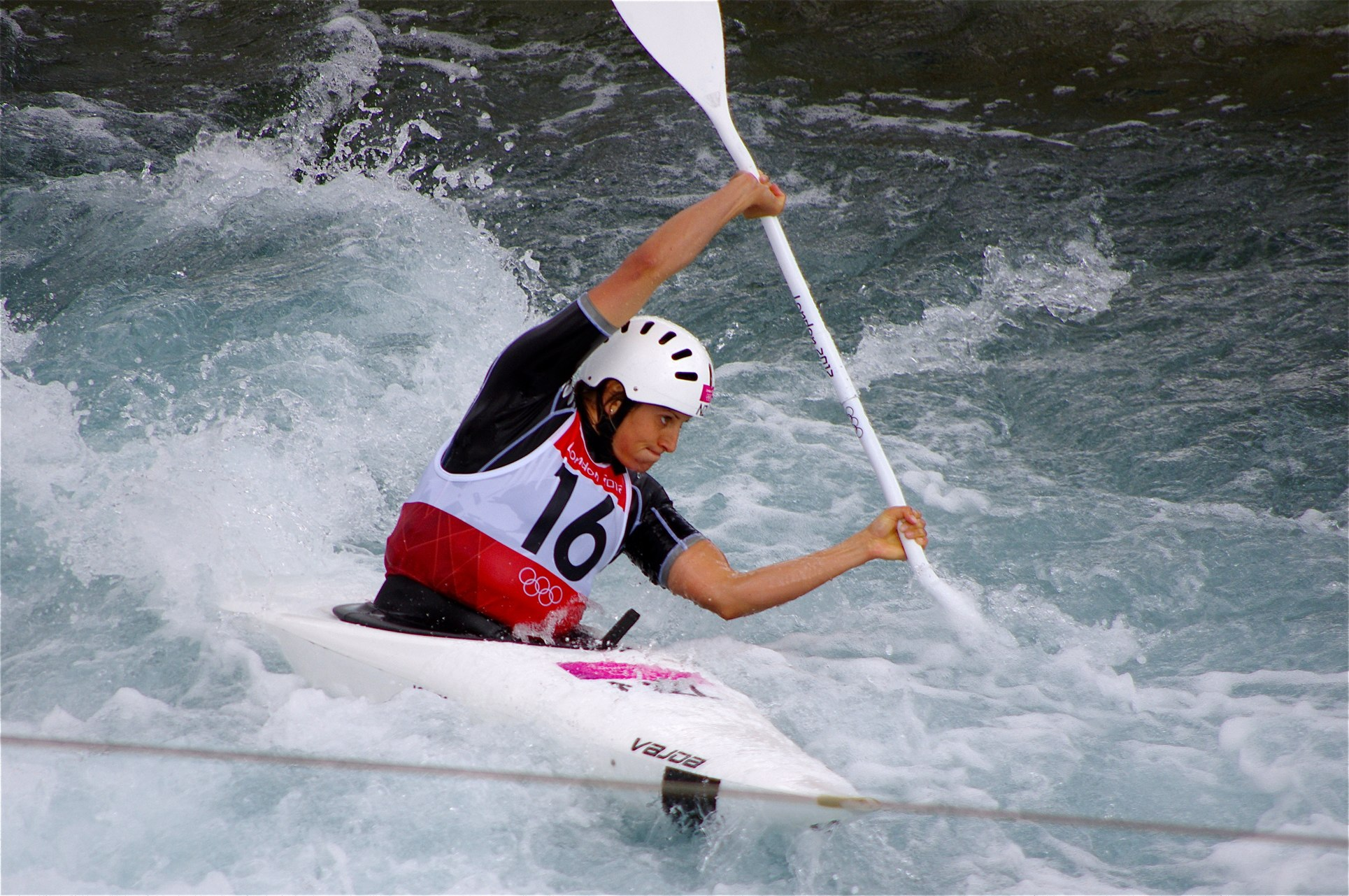
Luuka Jones

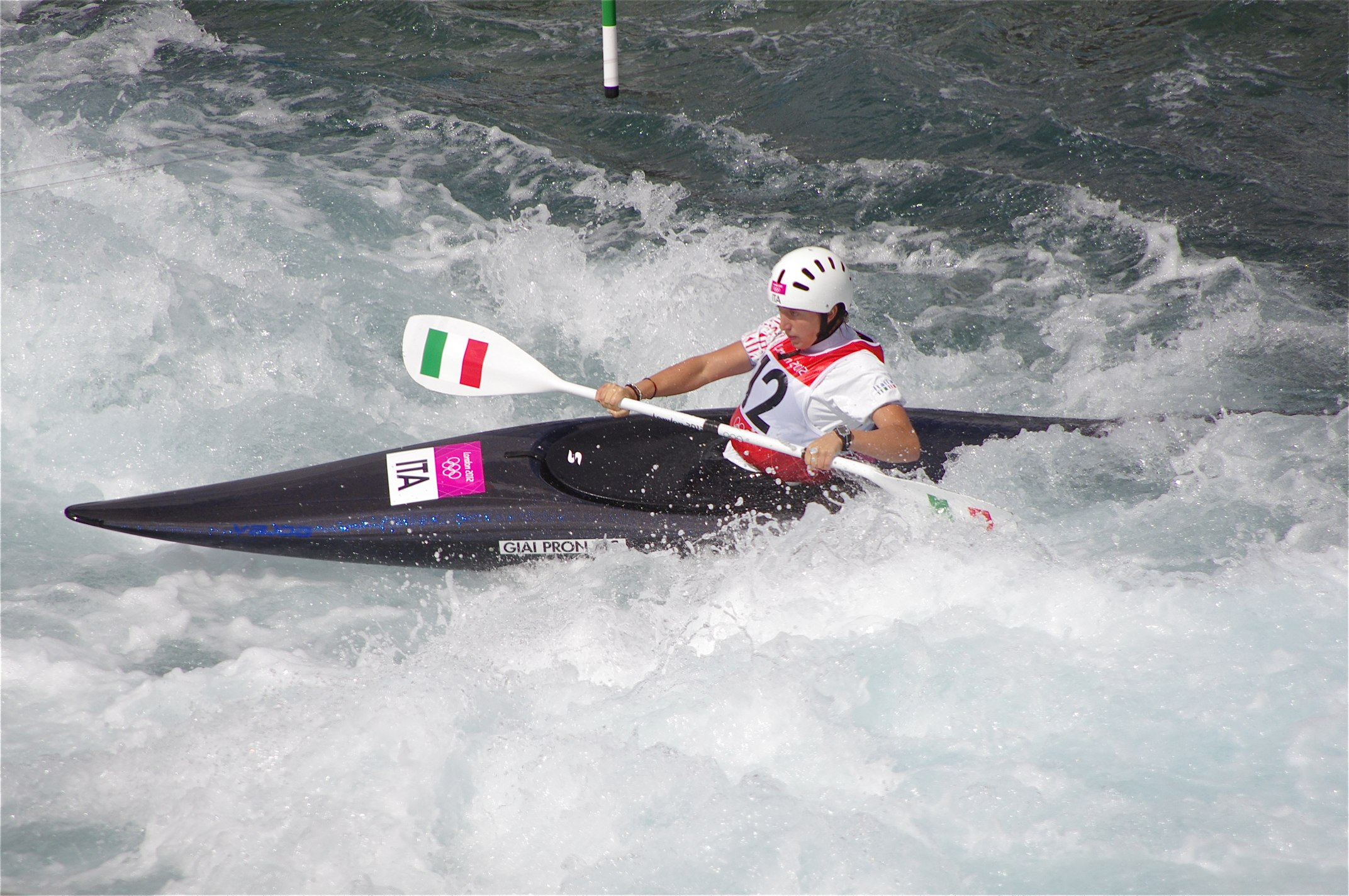
Maria Clara Giai Pron
