= Caroline Queen =

American canoeist (born 1992)

Caroline Queen (born March 5, 1992, in Knoxville, Tennessee) is an American slalom canoer. At the 2012 Summer Olympics she competed in the K-1 event, finishing 17th in the heats, failing to qualify for the semifinals.

Caroline first began paddling slalom at the age of nine, at Valley Mill Camp in her hometown of Darnestown, Maryland. She soon entered regular training in the summer of 2002, when she began working with Martin Nevaril, who would later become a US Junior National Team Coach. With Martin’s guidance, she blossomed as a young paddler. In 2006, then fourteen-year-old Queen attended her first US National team trials, when surprised the slalom community by winning Day 2 of the competition.

In 2007, with help from Joe Jacobi, she became the youngest woman ever to make the US National team. She has been on the National Team since then, competing every year except 2009 when she suffered an ACL injury. She recovered from the ACL surgery and went on to become the 2011 and 2012 US National Champion and make the US Olympic team in 2012.

With her result at the 2011 World Championships she won an Olympic place for the US. Queen and Ashley Nee were the two canoeists in contention for the place. Queen won the place by finishing higher in the World Cup event at Cardiff in 2012.

She attended the Bullis School in Potomac, Maryland, and she graduated with a BS in Psychology from Davidson College in Davidson, North Carolina.
