= Marta Kharitonova =

Russian canoeist

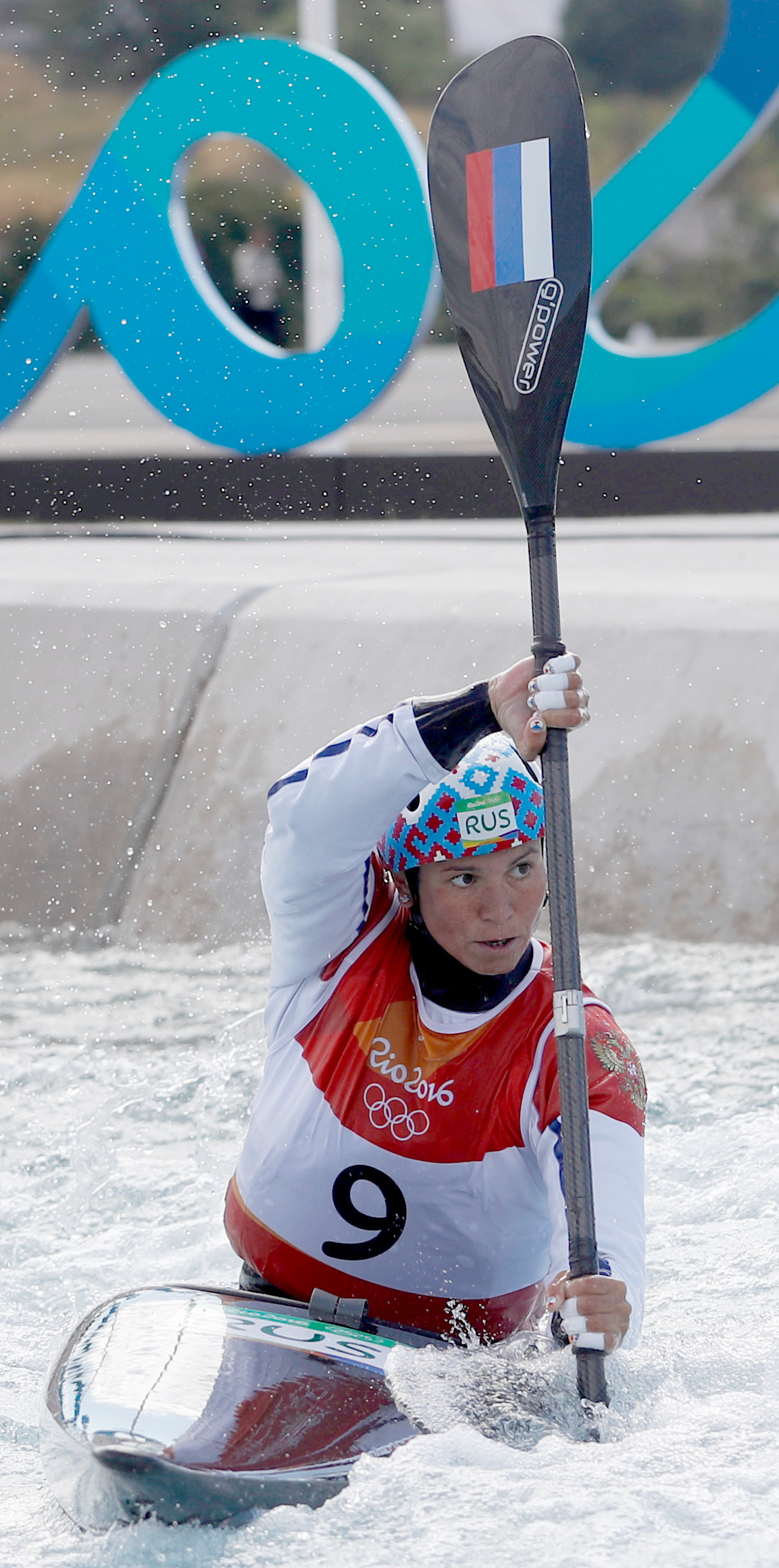
- Kharitonova at the 2016 Olympics

Personal information
- Nationality: Russian
- Born: 26 September 1984 (age 41) Leningrad, Russian SFSR, Soviet Union
- Height: 167 cm (5 ft 6 in)
- Weight: 62 kg (137 lb)

Sport
- Country: Russia
- Sport: Canoe slalom
- Event: K1
Medal record
Women's canoe slalom
Representing Russia
World Championships
Bronze medal – third place	2019 La Seu d'Urgell	K1 team

Marta Nikolayevna Kharitonova (Russian: Марта Николаевна Харитонова; born 26 September 1984) is a Russian slalom canoeist who has competed at the international level since 2002.

She won a bronze medal in the K1 team event at the 2019 ICF Canoe Slalom World Championships in La Seu d'Urgell. Kharitonova competed in the K1 event at the 2012 and 2016 Olympics placing 9th and 15th, respectively.

== World Cup individual podiums ==
Season	Date	Venue	Position	Event
2011	14 Aug 2011	Prague	3rd	K1
