= Laurane Picoche =

French athlete

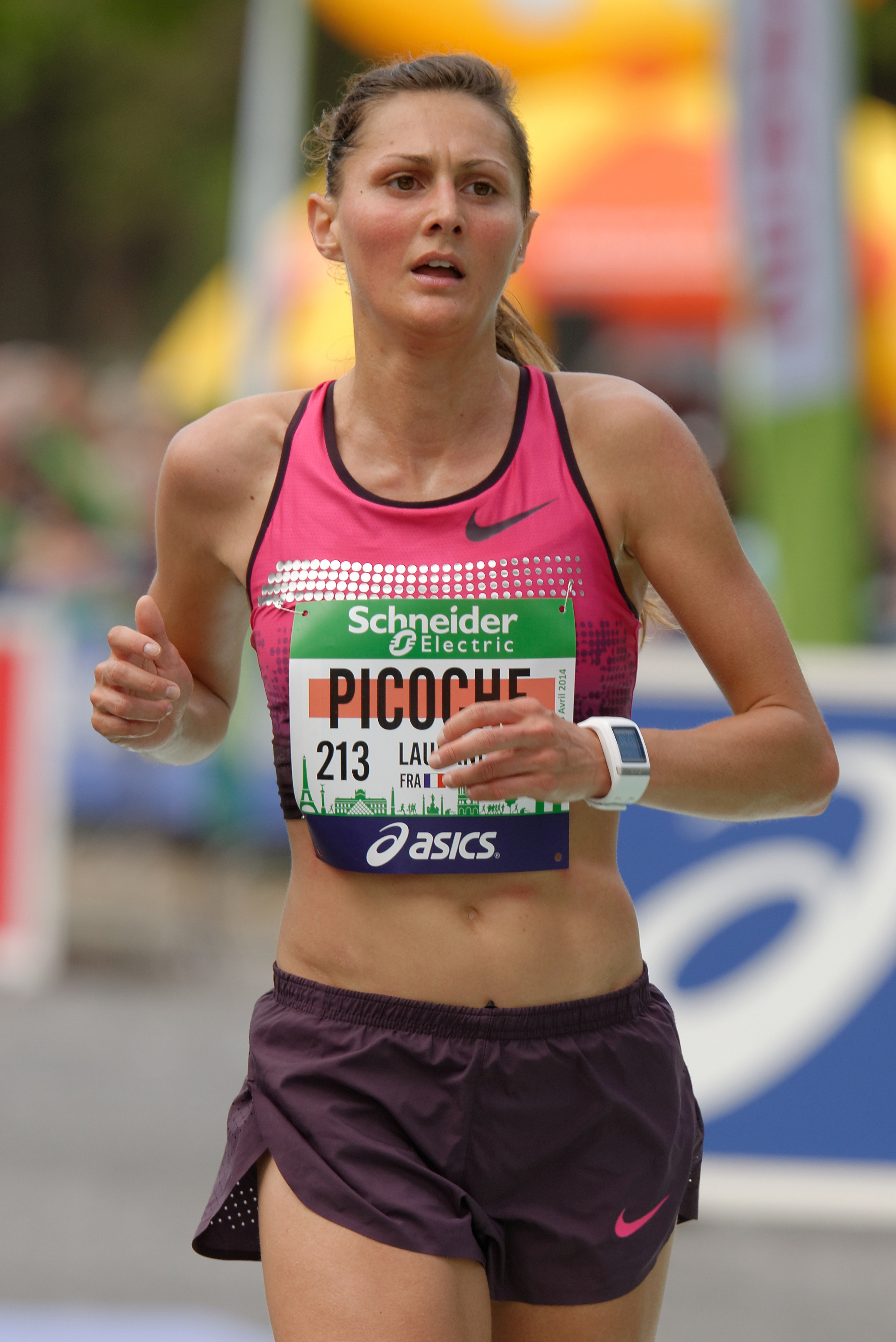
- Laurane Picoche at the 2014 Paris Marathon.

Personal information
- Nationality: French
- Born: 17 July 1985 (age 40) Remiremont, (Vosges)
- Years active: 2010s
- Height: 1.74 m (5 ft 9 in)

Sport
- Event: distance running
- Club: SCO Ste-Marguerite Marseille

Laurane Picoche (born 17 July 1985, at Remiremont) is a French athlete, who specializes in the distance races and in the middle-distance races.

== Biography ==
In cross-country she received the team silver medal at the 2012 European Cross Country Championships, at Szentendre Hungary, and placed fifth there in the individual event. She was also this same year the French Cross Country Champion.

She won the 1500 meters title during the 2013 French Athletic Championships which took place in Charléty Stadium in Paris.

She placed 8th at the 2014 Paris Marathon in 2:39:22.

She placed 6th in the 2015 Paris Half Marathon just behind her compatriot Karine Pasquier, in 1:13:47

=== Records ===
Personal Bests
Event	Performance	Location	Date
1 500 m	4:11.60	Tomblaine	26 June 2009
5 000 m	15:48.81	Huelva	12 June 2013
Marathon	2:39:20	Paris	6 April 2014
