= Moe Kaifuchi =

Japanese canoeist

Moe Kaifuchi (海渕 萌, Kaifuchi Moe; born 16 June 1986 in Hachiōji, Tokyo) is a Japanese slalom canoer. At the 2012 Summer Olympics she competed in the K-1 event, finishing 19th in the heats, failing to qualify for the semifinals.
