= Émilie Fer =

French canoeist

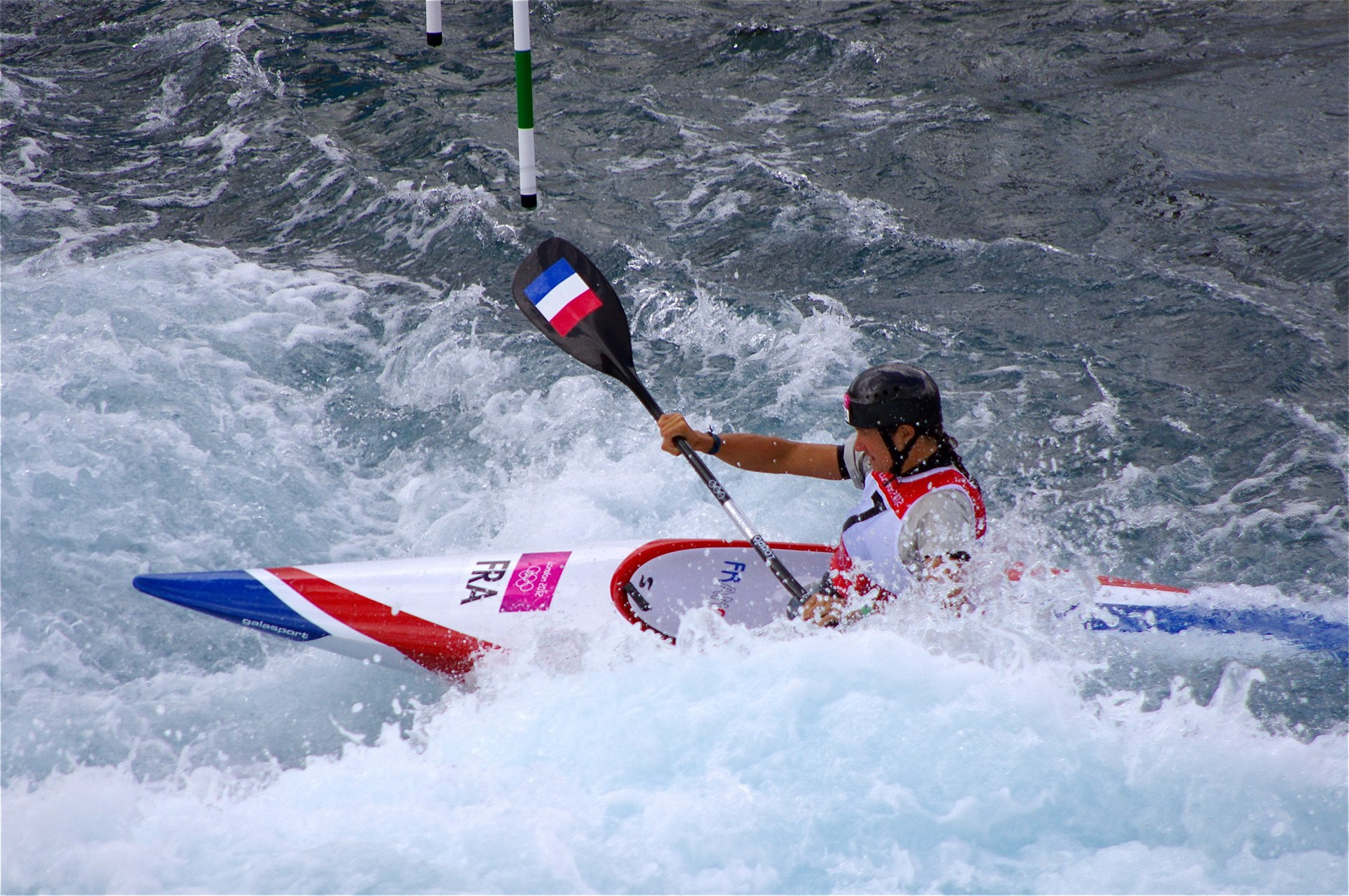
- Fer at the 2012 Summer Olympics

Personal information
- Born: 17 February 1983 in Saint-Maurice, France
Medal record
Women's canoe slalom
Representing France
Olympic Games
Gold medal – first place	2012 London	K1
World Championships
Gold medal – first place	2006 Prague	K1 team
Gold medal – first place	2013 Prague	K1
Gold medal – first place	2014 Deep Creek Lake	K1 team
Bronze medal – third place	2015 London	K1 team
European Championships
Gold medal – first place	2013 Krakow	K1 team
Silver medal – second place	2009 Nottingham	K1
Silver medal – second place	2012 Augsburg	K1 team
Bronze medal – third place	2014 Vienna	K1
Bronze medal – third place	2014 Vienna	K1 team
Bronze medal – third place	2015 Markkleeberg	K1 team
U23 European Championships
Bronze medal – third place	2005 Kraków	K1 team
Bronze medal – third place	2006 Nottingham	K1 team

Émilie Fer (born 17 February 1983 in Saint-Maurice) is a French slalom canoeist who competed at the international level from 2000 to 2016.

She won a gold medal in the K1 event at the 2012 Summer Olympics in London. She also finished seventh in the K1 event at the 2008 Summer Olympics in Beijing.

Fer won four medals at the ICF Canoe Slalom World Championships with three golds (K1: 2013; K1 team: 2006, 2014) and a bronze (K1 team: 2015). She also six medals at the European Championships (1 gold, 2 silvers and 3 bronzes).

On 1 January 2013, Fer was made a Knight (Chevalier) of the Legion of Honour.

She announced her retirement in 2017.

== World Cup individual podiums ==
Season	Date	Venue	Position	Event
2012	24 Jun 2012	La Seu d'Urgell	2nd	K1
2013	30 Jun 2013	Augsburg	1st	K1
2013	25 Aug 2013	Bratislava	1st	K1
2014	3 Aug 2014	La Seu d'Urgell	3rd	K1
2015	16 Aug 2015	Pau	1st	K1
