= Ava Hutchinson =

Irish long-distance runner (born 1983)

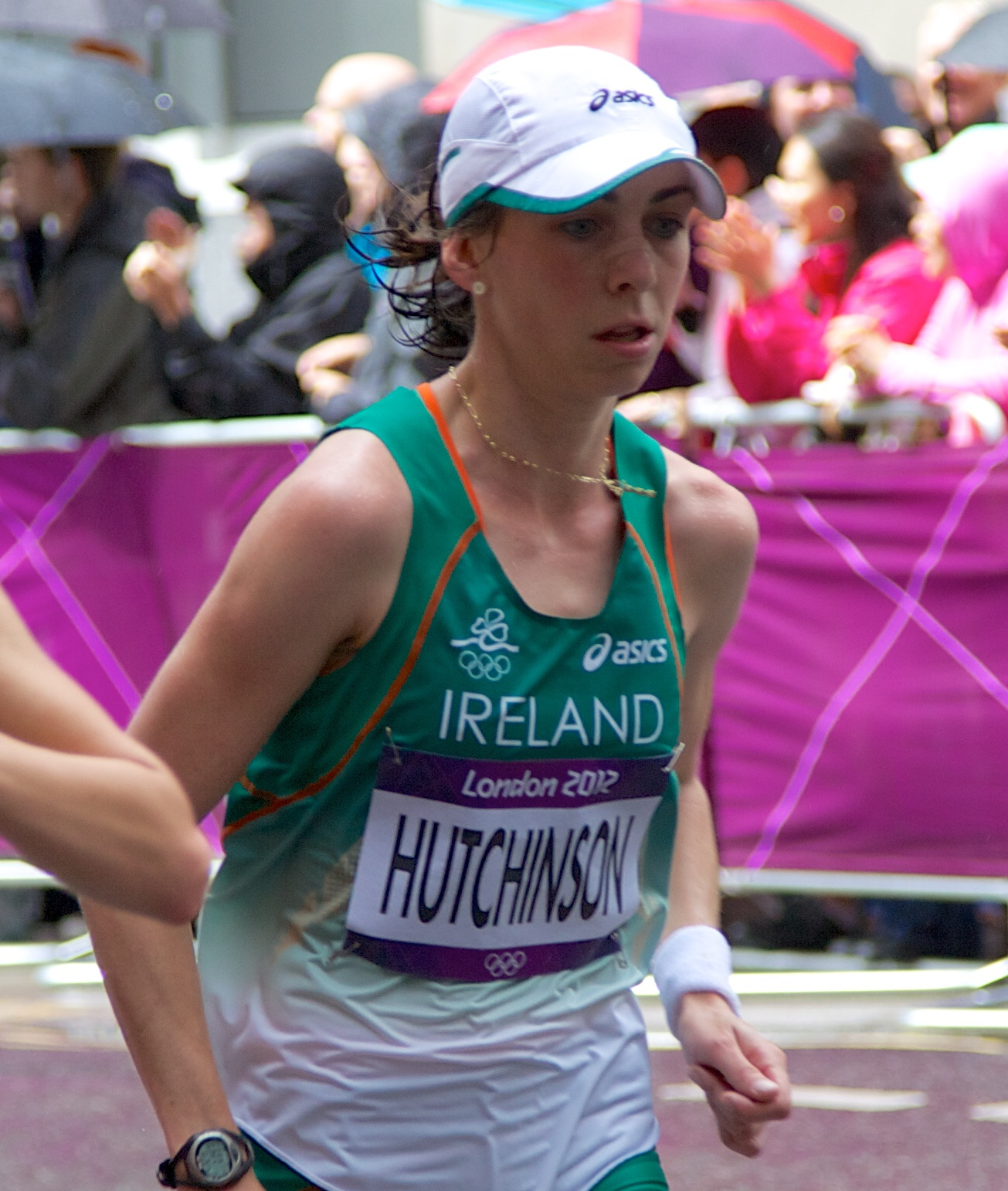

Personal information
- Born: 30 March 1983 (age 43)
- Height: 1.65 m (5 ft 5 in)
- Weight: 51 kg (112 lb)

Sport
- Country: Ireland
- Sport: Athletics
- Event: Marathon

Achievements and titles
- Personal bests: 5000 m – 15:51.49 (2013); Half Marathon – 74:17 (2011); Marathon – 2:35:33 (2012)

Ava Hutchinson (born 30 March 1983) is an Irish long distance runner who won team gold for Ireland at the 2012 European Cross Country Championships in Budapest. Her gold medal-winning teammates were Fionnuala Britton, Linda Byrne, Lizzie Lee, Sara Treacy and Sarah McCormack.

== Biography ==
Hutchinson ran on the Butler cross country team from 2004 to 2006. She was the Horizon League Cross Country Athlete of the Year in 2006. She ran for the track and field team from 2005 to 2007.

Hutchinson qualified for the London 2012 under the Olympic A standard after posting a time of 2:35:33 at the 2012 Houston Marathon, setting a new personal best. She is an Olympian after competing at London 2012 in the marathon.

She has also twice competed in the World Cross Country championships.
