= Maria Clara Giai Pron =

Italian canoeist (born 1992)

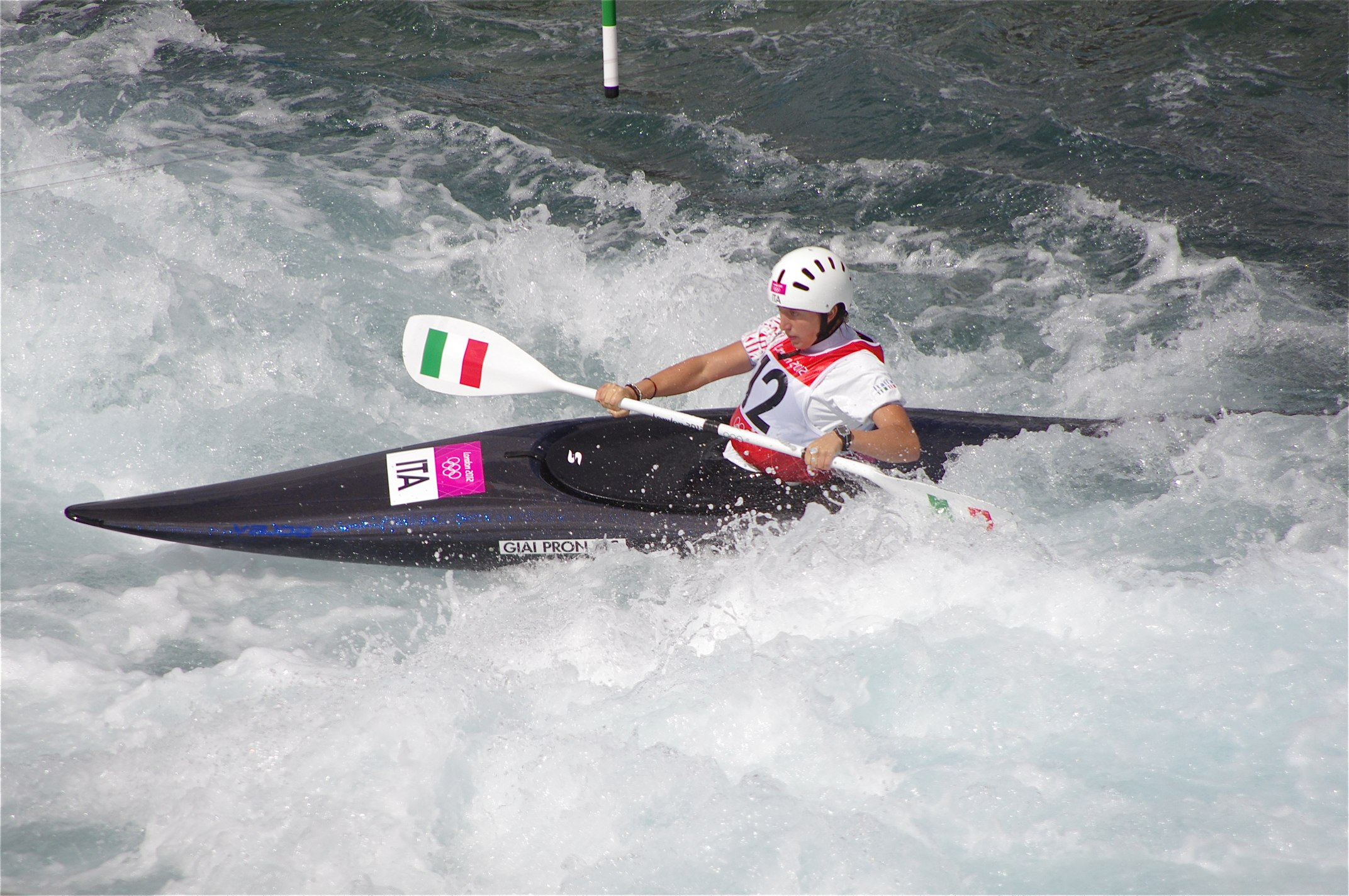
- Maria Clara Giai Pron at the 2012 Summer Olympics

Personal information
- Nationality: Italian
- Born: 31 July 1992 (age 33) Turin, Italy

Sport
- Country: Italy
- Sport: Canoeing
- Event: Slalom
- Club: G.S. Marina Militare
Medal record
U23 European Championships
Silver medal – second place	2011 Banja Luka	K1
Silver medal – second place	2013 Bourg-Saint-Maurice	K1 team
Bronze medal – third place	2012 Solkan	K1
Junior European Championships
Gold medal – first place	2010 Markkleeberg	K1

Maria Clara Giai Pron (born 31 July 1992) is an Italian slalom canoeist who has competed at the international level since 2007.

Giai Pron is an athlete of the Gruppo Sportivo della Marina Militare,

== Biography ==
She competed in the K1 event at the 2012 Summer Olympics where she qualified for the semifinal after an impressive 3rd place in the heats. However, she failed to qualify for the final after missing a gate in the semifinal, finishing 15th overall in the competition.

She is the younger sister of five-time Olympian and world championship medalist Cristina Giai Pron. She is also a cousin of swimmer Alessandro Miressi, a three-time Olympic medalist and world record holder.
