= Đỗ Quang Giai =

- Mayor Đỗ Quang Giai in 1952

Senator of the Republic of Vietnam
- In office 1966–1972

Personal details
- Born: July 19, 1900 Phượng Dực, Thường Tín, Hà Đông, French Indochina
- Died: August 27, 1972 (aged 72) South Vietnam
- Spouse: Trần Thị Quy
- Children: 10
- Education: French Indochina School of Law and Administration
- Occupation: Politician, civil servant, jurist
- Known for: Chairman of Senate Foreign Relations Committee; recipient of the Order of the British Empire (OBE)

Đỗ Quang Giai (July 19, 1900 – August 27, 1972) was a Senator of the Republic of Vietnam from 1966 to 1972. In his early political career, he was Mayor of Hà Nội from 1952 until Vietnam was partitioned at the 17th parallel as a result of the Geneva Accord in 1954. He was a staunch nationalist who opposed the French colonial rule and the Hanoi's communist government.

== Early life and family ==
Giai was born on 07/19/1899. The Đỗ-Quang traced their roots to the village of Phượng Dực, in the district of Thường Tín and the city of Hà Đông. His family moved to Hanoi to find work and settled in the village of Linh Quang behind the Hanoi railway station between the streets of Khâm Thiên and Sinh Từ (now called Nguyễn Khuyến). As a young man, he attended the French Indochina School of Law and Administration (Ecole de Droit et d'Administration) and worked as Tham Biện at the Toà Sứ Hưng Yên. He took exam to become Lục Sự but then went back to school with the goal to join the civil service. After graduating he served as tri phủ (district chief). He was married to Trần Thị Quy and had ten children.

== Early career ==
In 1946 – 1947, after the French returned to Vietnam, the French Army worked to clear the highway between Hanoi and Hải Phòng. He headed a delegation to look into the economic status of the people who were uprooted along the highway. The French disliked him because he belonged to the Tam Điểm Association (Freemasonery) together with Nguyễn Văn Vĩnh and because he wrote articles about the economy on French News Paper. When the French established the Comité de Gestion des Affaires Administratives Indigenes (Hội Đồng An Dân), he became the vice chairperson of the committee. When Emperor Bảo Đại returned to Vietnam from Hong Kong, the committee became the Comité d'Executif Administrative (Hội Đồng Chấp Chính) with more political power, he remained the committee vice chairperson. During the Nguyễn Văn Xuân administration, he served as Thứ Trưởng Nội Vụ (Deputy Minister of Interior) and was part of a National Committee to select the National Anthem and National Flag for an independent state of Vietnam. The committee was headed by Nguyễn Hữu Thiều as the chairman with members from different parts of Vietnam: Đỗ Quang Giai (North), Trần Văn Lý (Central), Nguyễn Văn Xuân (South) and representatives from the Cao Đài and Hoà Hoả religious sectors. Later, he served as Chánh Án Tòa Án Hỗn Hợp Hà Nội (Hanoi Joint Commission Court) under the Bảo Đại administration.

In 1952, he became Mayor of Hanoi during the Nguyễn Văn Tâm administration and served until 1954 when he was dismissed by the newly formed North Vietnam Defense Committee for collaborating with the French in evacuating anti-Communists. He was still the mayor when the Communist force surrounded Hanoi trying to infiltrate the French "defence box". He organized citizens into "defence groups" and was giving assurance from the French Commander that the French would defend Hanoi. After the Geneva agreement was signed to temporarily divide the country at the 17th parallel, he fled to South Vietnam with his family.

== Life in South Vietnam ==
After moving to Saigon, he worked at different places then retired. He later came out of retirement to work for Hoàng Kim Quy, an entrepreneur and businessman whom he knew from Hanoi. During that time he studied English and eventually became chairman of the Vietnam British Association and received an honorary medal of the Order of the British Empire (OBE). He is probably the only Vietnamese who received an OBE. He then worked for the U.S. Embassy with Dr. Douglas Pike. In 1966, he was invited to a reception for all OBE KBE recipients in London by Queen Elizabeth. The U.S. Government funded his trip with the condition that he spoke on the British and Belgium radio programs.

== Return to Politics ==
After he returned from overseas, he ran and was elected to the Senate of the Republic of South Vietnam on the same ticket with his friend Hoàng Kim Quy. He served as the Chairman of the Senate Foreign Relations Committee and was a leading and vocal political opponent of the president and his administration. He was the deputy chief of the major opposition bloc in the senate.

He was often regarded by some Americans as the Senator Fulbright of South Vietnam but unlike Fulbright, he was strongly against the Hanoi communist government and fully supported President Nixon's policy in Vietnam. He was also a vice president of South Vietnam's Anti-Communist League. Giving his past experience, he opposed a coalition government and firmly believed that the Communists would never agree to any peaceful resolution to end the war
