= John Murray Cuddihy =

American sociologist (1922 - 2011)

John Murray Cuddihy (January 22, 1922 - April 18, 2011) was an American sociologist. He was a member of the doctoral faculty at the Graduate School and University Center of the City University of New York (GSUC).

He is the author of No Offense: Civil Religion and Protestant Taste (1978) and The Ordeal of Civility: Freud, Marx, Lévi-Strauss and the Jewish Struggle with Modernity (1974), two books in the sociology of religion. Cuddihy has been described as a "Catholic atheist", and "a brilliant yet eccentric critic of contemporary American Jewry".

== Academic career ==
Cuddihy received his bachelor's degree from St. John's College (Annapolis), three M.A.s: two from Columbia University and a third from the New School for Social Research in New York City. He took a Ph.D. in sociology at Rutgers University.

He taught courses in sociological theory, sociology of religion, and the sociology of diaspora Jewry.

== Works ==
His doctoral dissertation was later published, in 1974, as The Ordeal of Civility. No Offense: Civil Religion and Protestant Taste was published in 1978.

In The Ordeal of Civility, Cuddihy explicates the wrenching process of adjusting to modernity experienced by the shtetl Jews of the Pale in the nineteenth and early twentieth centuries who had to adapt quickly from a tribal culture to a modern Protestant civil culture rather than slowly adjusting over the centuries. It is in this context that he locates the efforts of Jewish intellectuals, such as Karl Marx, Sigmund Freud and Claude Lévi-Strauss to facilitate the transition by providing a cohesive narrative that attempts to universalize the experience and thus provide an apologia to both the in-group of Jews and the out-group of gentiles.

In No Offense, a critique of American civil religion, Cuddihy argues that Catholic and Jewish intellectuals in America gave up the distinctive religious claims of Catholicism and Judaism, respectively, in the interests of not offending the Protestant majority. Cuddihy views various intellectual critiques of modernity - both conservative and radical - as the product of resentment against the more successful, enlightened, Protestant majority.
