= Cristina Giai Pron =

Italian canoeist (born 1974)

Medal record

Women's canoe slalom

Representing Italy

World Championships
Bronze medal – third place	2002 Bourg St.-Maurice	K1

European Championships
Bronze medal – third place	1996 Augsburg	K1 team

Junior World Championships
Gold medal – first place	1992 Sjoa	K1

Maria Cristina Giai Pron (born 21 August 1974 in Turin) is an Italian slalom canoeist who competed at the international level from 1989 to 2010.

She won a bronze medal in the K1 event at the 2002 ICF Canoe Slalom World Championships in Bourg St.-Maurice. She also won a bronze medal in the K1 team event at the 1996 European Championships in Augsburg.

Giai Pron also competed in five Summer Olympics, earning her best finish of fourth in the K1 event in Atlanta in 1996.

Her younger sister Maria Clara represented Italy at the 2012 Summer Olympics in London and her cousin Alessandro Miressi is a three-time Olympic medalist and world record holder in swimming.

== World Cup individual podiums ==
Season	Date	Venue	Position	Event
1996	9 Jun 1996	La Seu d'Urgell	2nd	K1
1997	29 Jun 1997	Björbo	1st	K1
1997	28 Jul 1997	Ocoee	3rd	K1
