= Joanne Cuddihy =

Irish sprinter

Personal information
- Nationality: Irish
- Born: 11 May 1984 (age 42) Dublin, Ireland
- Height: 1.84 m (6 ft 1/2 in)
- Weight: 65 kg (143 lb; 10.2 st)

Sport
- Sport: Running
- Event: 400 metres
- College team: University College Dublin Athletics Club
- Club: Kilkenny City Harriers
- Coached by: Paddy Fay
- Retired: 2012

Achievements and titles
- Personal best: 50.73 seconds
Medal record
Women's athletics
Representing Ireland
European Junior Championships
Silver medal – second place	2003 Tampere	400 m
European Team Championships
Silver medal – second place	2009 Banska Bystrica	Second League

Joanne Cuddihy (born 11 May 1984) is an Irish sprint athlete, competing for the Kilkenny City Harriers.

She was the Irish 400 metres outdoor women's record holder with a time of 50.73 seconds achieved in Osaka in 2007.

== Career ==
=== Junior competition ===
At the 2001 IAAF/Westel World Youth Championships, Cuddihy qualified for the final of the 400 metres by finishing second in her heat with a time of 54.16, a season's best. On 14 July, Cuddihy finished fifth in the final at the World Youth Championships. The following year at the IAAF/Coca-Cola World Junior Championships in Kingston, Jamaica, Cuddihy finished sixth in the final. On 12 June 2003, at a European GP meeting in Riga, Latvia, Cuddihy broke the junior Irish national record in the 400 metres with a time of 53.21 seconds. At the NCAA Championships in Sacramento, California in mid-June 2003, Cuddihy came second with a time of 53.85 seconds. The following month, she won a silver medal at the 2003 European Athletics Junior Championships in the 400 metres.

=== Senior competition ===
Following her silver medal at the European Athletics Junior Championships in 2003, Cuddihy moved into senior competition. At the 2003 World Championships in Athletics held in Paris, France, Cuddihy qualified for the final of the 400 metres with a time of 53.68 seconds. She participated in the 2004 Irish National Indoor Championships in Belfast, Northern Ireland, where she won the 400 metres in a new all-comers record of 53.50 seconds over Moushaumi Robinson. As a result of her win, she was automatically selected to be part of the Irish team for the 2004 IAAF World Indoor Championships held the following month. At the championships, Cuddihy finished sixth in her heat of the 400 metres, failing to progress further. She was also part of the 4 x 400 metres relay time with Michelle Carey, Karen Shinkins, and Ciara Sheehy. In July 2004, Cuddihy came second in the Irish National Championships behind Shinkins. In July 2005, Cuddihy finished second at the Irish National Championships behind Shinkins. At the 2005 World University Games, Cuddihy made it to the semi-finals of the 400 metres, but failed to progress further after finishing fifth.

In the eighteen months prior to July 2006, Cuddihy suffered from glandular fever and underwent operations on the cartilage on both knees. At the 2006 National Track and Field Championships, Cuddihy set a personal best time of 23.33 seconds to win the 200 metres title, and set a championship record of 51.28 to win the 400 metres. Her championship record was the fastest time run by an Irishwoman in Ireland. The following month, at the 2006 European Athletics Championships in Gothenburg, Cuddihy qualified for the semi-finals of the 400 metres by running a time of 51.41 seconds to finish second in her heat. She then qualified for the final by finishing third in her semi-final, and setting a personal best time of 51.09 seconds. She finished eight in the final with a time of 51.46 seconds. Cuddihy was also a member of the Irish 4 x 100 metres relay team at the European Championships, alongside Derval O'Rourke, Ailis McSweeney, and Anna Boyle. The quartet failed to make the final, but set a new Irish record for the event of 44.38 seconds.

In 2007, Cuddihy decided to take a break from her medical studies and focus exclusively on her athletics for a full year. In April 2007 Cuddihy moved to Los Angeles in the United States for specialised coaching with Dan Pfaff. On 9 June, Cuddihy won a 200 metres race in Vancouver, British Columbia, Canada with a time of 23.80 seconds. In June, Cuddihy appeared at European Cup First League 'A' match, where she was part of the Irish 4 x 100 metres relay quartet that finished third. At the 2007 British Grand Prix in July, Cuddihy came third in the 400 metres behind Nicola Sanders and Monique Henaghan. That same month she won both the 200 and 400 metres events at the Irish National Senior Track and Field Championships, making it the second successive year she had won both. Cuddihy competed at the 2007 World Championships in Athletics in Osaka, Japan that August. She ran a season's best in the heats to qualify for the semi-finals with a third-place finish. In the semi-finals she recorded a personal best time of 50.73 seconds, setting a new Irish national record and making her the first Irish woman to have run under 51 seconds at 400 metres. Despite this, she did not qualify for the final. Her new Irish record also qualified her to compete in the 2008 Olympic Games in Beijing, China. In early and mid-2008 she suffered from knee problems, however, jeopardising her ability to compete at the Olympics. Despite the injury, she competed in the heats of the 400 metres but was unable to qualify for the semi-finals. She stated that competing in the Olympics "would have been a dream come true if [she] wasn't injured".

In early July 2009, she participated in the 200 metres at the World University Games, successfully reaching the semi-finals. She finished her semi-final with a time of 24.53 seconds, leaving her in fifth place, which meant she did not reach the final. Cuddihy did not participate in the 2009 World Championships in Athletics, as she had taken time out to focus on her academic studies. Following a hiatus, Cuddihy returned to athletics at the Melbourne Track Classic in March 2010, where she placed third in the 400 metres with a time of 52.95 seconds. In early July 2010, Cuddihy won the Irish National Championships in the 400 metres with a time of 52.76 seconds. At the 2010 European Athletics Championships in Barcelona, Spain, Cuddihy made the semi-finals, but was unable to make the final after finishing fourth in her semi-final and missing a fastest loser position. She was also a member of the Irish 4 x 400 metres relay team alongside Marian Andrews, Brona Furlong, and Michelle Carey which failed to progress from the heats after finishing sixth.

In 2011, Cuddihy moved to Australia for full-time training. At the European Team Championships in mid-June Cuddihy was part of the Irish team that finished tenth overall, retaining their position in the 1st League. On 25 June, Cuddihy won the 400 metres race during a meet in Nivelles, Belgium, with a time of 53.28 seconds. In early August, Cuddihy once again won the 400 metres at the Irish national championships, finishing with a time of 52.15 metres. Cuddihy competed at the 2011 World Championships in Daegu, South Korea in the 400 metres after securing the B-standard qualifying time. She came third in her heat, qualifying for the semi-finals with a time of 51.82 seconds. During the semi-finals however, Cuddihy was disqualified after a false start. She returned to compete in the 4 x 400 metres relay. She, along with Marian Andrews-Heffernan, Claire Bergin, and Michelle Carey set a new Irish record of 3:27.48, but failed to qualify for the final after finishing fourth in their heat.

At the 2012 Summer Olympics in London, Cuddihy qualified for the semi-finals of the 400m as a fastest loser with a time of 52.09. She failed to make the final after finishing fifth in her semi-final. Cuddihy retired from professional athletics following the Olympics.

== Personal life ==
Cuddihy's father, Bill, is a Kilkenny hurling doctor. Her younger sister, Catriona is also a 400-metre runner.

Cuddihy studied medicine at University College Dublin, and is a qualified doctor. Since retiring from athletics, Cuddihy has been working at Temple Street Children's University Hospital.
