= Jihane Samlal =

Moroccan slalom canoer (born 1983)

Personal information
- Nationality: Moroccan
- Born: 25 November 1983 (age 42) Dole, Jura, France
- Height: 167 cm (5 ft 6 in)
- Weight: 62 kg (137 lb)

Sport
- Country: Morocco
- Sport: Canoe slalom
- Club: CK Dole

Jihane Samlal (Arabic: جيهان سملال, born 25 November 1983, in Dole, Jura, France) is a Moroccan slalom canoer. At the 2012 Summer Olympics she competed in the K-1 event, finishing 21st in the heats, failing to qualify for the semifinals.
