= Hannah Craig =

Irish slalom canoer

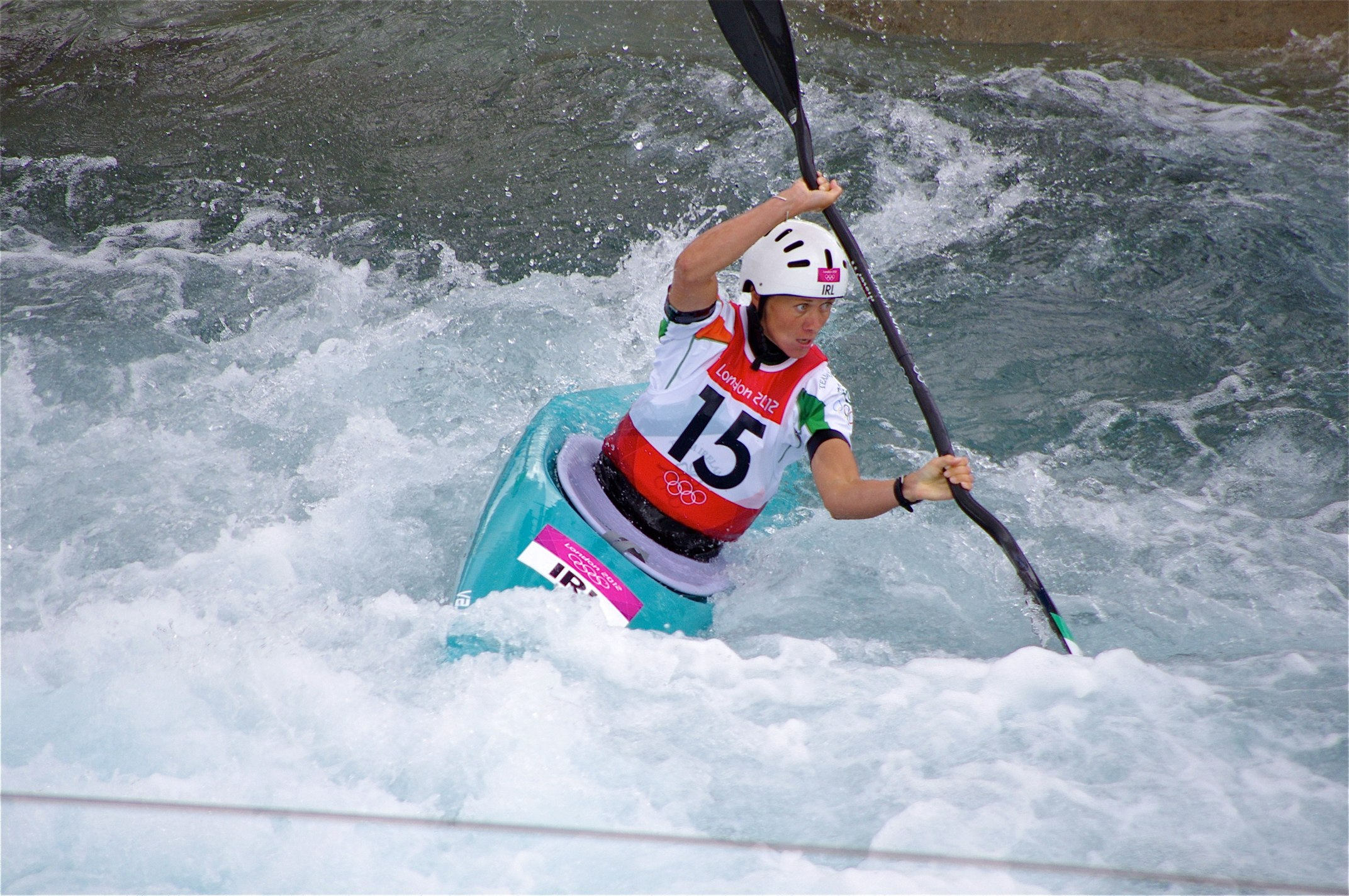
Craig at the 2012 Summer Olympics

Hannah Craig (born 10 February 1983 in Ballymoney, Northern Ireland) is an Irish slalom canoer. At the 2012 Summer Olympics she competed in the K-1 event, finishing 10th in the final.

In 2012, she was reported to be from Armoy.

== Telephone call ==
Famously, when a penalty was applied to Craig during the 2012 Summer Olympics, Carl Dunne, head of the Irish canoeing team, telephoned RTÉ's analyst to discuss the possibility of appealing the decision. The analyst took the telephone call live on television as a bemused Michael Lyster watched on.
