= Linda Byrne =

Irish long-distance runner

Personal information
- Born: 13 May 1986 (age 40)
- Height: 1.63 m (5 ft 4 in)
- Weight: 50 kg (110 lb)

Sport
- Country: Ireland
- Sport: Athletics
- Event: Marathon

Linda Byrne (born 13 May 1986) is an Irish long distance runner who won team gold for Ireland at the 2012 European Cross Country Championships in Budapest. Finishing eighth overall in the women's senior race, Byrne's gold medal-winning teammates were Fionnuala Britton, Ava Hutchinson, Lizzie Lee, Sara Treacy and Sarah McCormack.

She is an Olympian having competed at the 2012 Summer Olympics in the marathon. She finished in 66th place with a time of 2:37:13.
