= Lizzie Lee =

Irish marathon runner

Personal information
- National team: Ireland
- Born: 22 May 1980 (age 46)
- Education: University College Cork

Sport
- Country: Ireland
- Sport: Athletics
- Event: Marathon
- Club: Leevale Athletic Club

Achievements and titles
- Olympic finals: 2012 & 2016
- Updated on 2 August 2016

Lizzie Lee (born 22 May 1980) is an Irish marathon runner. She qualified for the 2016 Olympics where she finished 57th.

== Biography ==
Lizzie Lee was born 22 May 1980 and is from Bishopstown. Lee is married with children, and after the birth of her second child, her coach Joe O'Connor created a tailored training regime to prepare her for competitive running. Lee has a degree in electrical engineering from University College Cork. She is a project manager for Apple Inc.

She is coached by 1972 Irish Olympian Donie Walsh. She trains with Leevale AC.

In 2009 Lee stopped competing in the triathlon so she could focus on long-distance running.

Lee captained the European Cross Country Championships which won a bronze medal in 2015. She was the second-fastest Irishwoman in the event, finishing in 13th.

The required time to qualify for the 2016 Summer Olympics in Rio was 2:42. She finished the Berlin Marathon in 2:32:51, the fifth fastest female Irish marathon time ever. Three Irishwomen qualified for the marathon in these Olympics, and Lee had the best time of the group.

In March 2018, Lee set a personal best time at the World Half Marathon Championships.
