= Catriona Cuddihy =

Irish athlete

Catriona Cuddihy (born 5 December 1986 in Kilkenny, Ireland) is an Irish athlete who was initially selected to compete at the 2012 Summer Olympics in the Women's 4 × 400 metres relay. Her selection was challenged by Joanna Mills, and Cuddihy was removed from selection. Cuddihy then appealed that decision, and was reinstated. The relay team, including Cuddihy, was one of 16 teams that made Olympic qualification. The team finished in sixth place, with a season best time. Cuddihy, although a member of the relay team, did not get to run.
