= Devin Haney vs. Vasiliy Lomachenko =

Boxing match

Checkmate
- Date: May 20, 2023
- Venue: MGM Grand Garden Arena, Las Vegas, Nevada, U.S.
- Title(s) on the line: WBA (Super), WBC, IBF, WBO, and The Ring lightweight titles

Tale of the tape
Boxer	Devin Haney	Vasiliy Lomachenko
Nickname	The Dream	Loma
Hometown	San Francisco, California, U.S.	Bilhorod-Dnistrovskyi, Odesa Oblast, Ukraine
Pre-fight record	29–0 (15 KO)	17–2 (11 KO)
Age	24 years, 6 months	35 years, 3 months
Height	5 ft 9 in (175 cm)	5 ft 7 in (170 cm)
Weight	134.9 lb (61 kg)	135 lb (61 kg)
Style	Orthodox	Southpaw
Recognition	WBA (Super), WBC, IBF, WBO, The Ring and TBRB Undisputed Lightweight Champion	WBC/WBO/The Ring; No. 1 Ranked Lightweight; IBF/TBRB; No. 2 Ranked Lightweight; WBA; No. 3 Ranked Lightweight; The Ring No. 7 ranked pound-for-pound fighter 3-division world champion

Result
- Haney wins via 12-round unanimous decision (116–112, 115–113, 115–113)

Devin Haney vs. Vasiliy Lomachenko, billed as Checkmate, was a professional boxing match contested on 20 May 2023, for the undisputed lightweight championship. The bout took place at the MGM Grand Garden Arena in Las Vegas, Nevada. The fight ended in a massive controversial unanimous decision win for Haney.

== Background ==
On 19 August 2019, Lomachenko defeated Luke Campbell and won the vacant WBC title, despite holding and defending belts with other sanctioning bodies. Just two weeks after this, Devin Haney defeated Zaur Abdullaev and won the WBC interim title, thus becoming the WBC mandatory challenger. Lomachenko opted to be named the WBC "franchise champion" and Haney was elevated from interim to world champion. This prompted Haney to accuse Lomachenko of "ducking" him.

On 27 March 2022, Haney struck a deal with unified lightweight champion George Kambosos Jr to fight for the undisputed championship. Lomachenko declined to fight Kambosos, opting to stay and fight for his country after Russia invaded Ukraine. Haney would defeat Kambosos to become the first undisputed lightweight champion since Pernell Whitaker. He would retain his titles by defeating Kambosos in a rematch that took place on 16 October 2022.

Discussions for the fight with Lomachenko began immediately after the Kambosos fight. Haney, a practicing Muslim, indicated that he preferred the fight to take place before March, so as to not conflict with Ramadan. He also accused his promoter Top Rank of favoritism towards Lomachenko, claiming that Top Rank and Lomachenko's management wanted the fight pushed to May to force him to stay weight-drained for longer. Eventually, a deal was struck for a fight at the MGM Grand on May 20.

== The fight ==
With Lomachenko coming in as the underdog for the first time in his career, much of the bout turned out to be closely contested, with both men finding success, Lomachenko scoring with clean combinations to the head, while Haney countered consistently with solid body shots. Late in the fight, Lomachenko became increasingly dominant, finding particular success in the 10th and 11th rounds. However, Haney rallied to win the final round on all three judges' scorecards.

Haney won the fight by unanimous decision. The sold-out crowd loudly booed the decision.

=== Official scorecards ===
Judge	Fighter	1	2	3	4	5	6	7	8	9	10	11	12	Total
Tim Cheatham	Haney	10	9	10	10	10	10	9	9	10	9	9	10	115
Tim Cheatham	Lomachenko	9	10	9	9	9	9	10	10	9	10	10	9	113
Dave Moretti	Haney	10	9	9	10	10	9	10	10	10	10	9	10	116
Dave Moretti	Lomachenko	9	10	10	9	9	10	9	9	9	9	10	9	112
David Sutherland	Haney	10	9	9	10	10	10	10	9	10	9	9	10	115
David Sutherland	Lomachenko	9	10	10	9	9	9	9	10	9	10	10	9	113

== Aftermath ==
The decision however, was greatly disputed, as many onlookers felt Lomachenko had done enough to win, including fellow boxers Shakur Stevenson and Jorge Linares, who had previously predicted a Haney victory. Actor Tom Holland argued that there was a "general consensus" that Lomachenko had won the fight. Judge Dave Moretti's scorecard, giving round 10 to Haney despite Lomachenko dominating that round, was heavily criticised. Others argued that as the fight had been close, a narrow result for Haney was not unreasonable. CompuBox punch stats showed Haney had landed 110 of 405 punches thrown (27%), while Lomachenko landed 124 of 564 (22%), with both boxers outlanding the other in five rounds each, the other two rounds being even. Lomachenko believed he had won and his team subsequently stated they would file an appeal regarding the result. Haney on his part praised Lomachenko, calling him his toughest opponent yet.

Regardless of the result, the fight and the performances of both men were widely praised. It was described by multiple accounts as "thrilling", with Lomachenko's display against a substantially younger and larger opponent being highly lauded.

After the event, Haney was fined $25,000 for violently shoving Lomachenko during the weigh-in faceoffs.

The event, which was a sell-out with a crowd of 14,436, produced by ESPN+ pay-per-view generated around 150,000 buys, grossing approximately $9 million in domestic revenue. According to Dan Rafael, the live gate was a “low seven figure gate.” Haney was guaranteed a $4 million purse and Lomachenko had a base purse of $3 million.

== Fight card ==
Confirmed bouts:

Main card (PPV)
Weight class				Method	Round	Time	Notes
Lightweight	Devin Haney (c)	def.	Vasiliy Lomachenko	UD	12/12		(Note: For WBA (Super), WBC, IBF, WBO, and The Ring lightweight titles)
Super featherweight	Oscar Valdez	def.	Adam Lopez	UD	10/10
Lightweight	Raymond Muratalla	def.	Jeremiah Nakathila	TKO	2/10	2:48	(Note: For vacant NABF and WBO Global lightweight title)
Undercard
Super flyweight	Junto Nakatani	def.	Andrew Moloney	KO	12/12	2:42	(Note: For vacant WBO super flyweight title)
Middleweight	Nico Ali Walsh	vs.	Danny Rosenberger	NC	8/8		(Note: Originally a split decision draw; overturned due to Rosenberger testing positive for illegal substance)
Super bantamweight	Floyd Diaz	def.	Luis Fernando Saavedra	UD	8/8
Lightweight	Abdullah Mason	def.	Desmond Lyons	TKO	6/6	0:32
Middleweight	Amari Jones	def.	Pachino Hill	TKO	6/6	1:16
Lightweight	Emiliano Vargas	def.	Rafael Jasso	KO	2/4	1:41

== Broadcasting ==
Country/Region	Broadcasters			
Country/Region	Free	Cable TV	PPV	Stream
United States (host)			ESPN+	
Ukraine	TBA			
Asia (inc. Indian subcontinent exc. Japan)		Fight Sports	Fight Sports Max	
Europe		Fight Sports	Fight Sports Max	
MENA		Fight Sports	Fight Sports Max	
Brazil		SporTV		Globoplay
Canada				TSN+ (undercard only)
Denmark			FITE	
Finland			FITE	
Norway			FITE	
Sweden			FITE	
France		RMC Sport		RMC BFM Play
Ireland		Sky Sports		Sky Go
United Kingdom		Sky Sports		Sky Go
Japan		Wowow		Wowow on Demand
Latin America (exc. Brazil)		ESPN		Star+
Mexico	Azteca 7			TV Azteca Deportes
Panama	RPC			Medcom Go
Poland	TVP Sport			TVP Go
Sub-saharan Africa		ESPN		ESPN Player

Preceded by vs. George Kambosos Jr II	Devin Haney's bouts 20 May 2023	Succeeded by vs. Regis Prograis
Preceded by vs. Jamaine Ortiz	Vasiliy Lomachenko's bouts 20 May 2023	Succeeded by vs. George Kambosos Jr
