= Andrew Moloney =

Australian boxer (born 1991)

Personal information
- Nickname: The Monster
- Born: Andrew John Moloney; 10 January 1991 (age 35) Mitcham, Victoria, Australia
- Height: 5 ft 5 in (165 cm)
- Weight: Super flyweight; Bantamweight

Boxing career
- Reach: 65 in (165 cm)
- Stance: Orthodox

Boxing record
- Total fights: 34
- Wins: 29
- Win by KO: 18
- Losses: 4
- No contests: 1
Medal record
Men's Amateur boxing
Representing Australia
Commonwealth Games
Gold medal – first place	2014 Glasgow	Flyweight

Andrew Moloney (born 10 January 1991) is an Australian professional boxer who has held the IBF super-flyweight title since June 2026 and previously, the WBA (Regular) super-flyweight title in 2020. He also held the WBA Oceania bantamweight title from 2016 to 2017 and the Commonwealth super-flyweight title in 2017. As an amateur, Moloney won a gold medal at the 2014 Commonwealth Games in the flyweight division.

== Amateur career ==
Moloney represented Australia at two Commonwealth Games in 2010 and 2014.

Moloney also competed in the 2009 World Amateur Boxing Championships, the 2011 World Amateur Boxing Championships, and the 2013 AIBA World Boxing Championships.

In his amateur career, Moloney has won 7 state and 7 national titles.

=== 2014 Commonwealth Games ===
Moloney qualified for the 2014 Commonwealth Games after claiming the Australian national amateur flyweight title.

He progressed through the preliminary bouts with a unanimous 3-0 win over Waisu Taiwo (Nigeria), before facing Northern Ireland's Ruairi Dalton in the quarterfinal stage, where he again progressed with a 3-0 decision.

Moloney then faced the hometown favourite Reece McFadden of Scotland, where Moloney adopted a patient gameplan to upset the Scot 2-1 on the judge's scorecards to progress through to the final.

The gold medal bout, staged at the SEC Armadillo, was contested with Pakistan's Muhammad Waseem. Moloney scored a unanimous 3-0 decision to claim the gold medal.

== Professional career ==
Following his success at the 2014 Commonwealth Games, Moloney turned professional in October 2014. In 2018, Moloney fought former titlist Luis Concepción, who was ranked #5 by the WBA and #15 WBC at the time, and beat him via tenth-round stoppage.

On 16 May 2019, legendary boxing promoter Bob Arum announced that Top Rank had signed both Andrew and his twin brother Jason as a part of their stable.

On 15 November 2019, Moloney, ranked #1 by the WBA at the time, challenged WBA #5 Elton Dharry for the vacant WBA interim super-flyweight title and came out victorious via eighth-round TKO. After Román González won his fight against Kal Yafai, originally set for the WBA (Regular) super-flyweight title, González was subsequently elevated to WBA (Super) champion, which left the space for Moloney to be elevated to the new WBA (Regular) super-flyweight champion.

On 12 May 2024 in Perth, Australia, Moloney was scheduled to challenge Carlos Cuadras for the interim WBC junior bantamweight title. On 27 March 2024 it was announced that Pedro Guevara replaced Cuadras, who withdrew due to injury. Moloney lost the fight by split decision. Post-fight he announced his retirement.

He soon changed course, unretiring and making his comeback on 15 December 2024, scoring a third round knockout over Jakrawut Manjungoen.

Moloney challenged IBF super-flyweight champion Willibaldo García at the Aichi Sky Expo in Tokoname, Japan, on 6 June 2026. He won by majority decision with the judges' scorecards reading 115–113, 115–113 and 114–114.

== Personal life ==
Andrew is a twin brother to Jason Moloney, who is also a professional boxer.

== Professional boxing record ==
34 fights	29 wins	4 losses
By knockout	18	1
By decision	11	3
No contests	1	

No.	Result	Record	Opponent	Type	Round, time	Date	Location	Notes
34	Win	29–4 (1)	Willibaldo García	MD	12	6 Jun 2026	Aichi Sky Expo, Tokoname, Japan	Won IBF super-flyweight title
33	Win	28–4 (1)	Pawan Kumar Arya	KO	5 (8), 2:09	1 Nov 2025	Vodafone Arena, Suva, Fiji	
32	Win	27–4 (1)	Jakrawut Majungoen	KO	3 (10), 2:11	15 Dec 2024	The Melbourne Pavilion, Melbourne, Victoria, Australia	
31	Loss	26–4 (1)	Pedro Guevara	SD	12	12 May 2024	RAC Arena, Perth, Western Australia, Australia	For vacant WBC interim super-flyweight title
30	Win	26–3 (1)	Judy Flores	UD	10	9 Dec 2023	Pullman Hotel, Albert Park, Victoria, Australia	Won vacant WBO Global super-flyweight title
29	Loss	25–3 (1)	Junto Nakatani	KO	12 (12), 2:42	20 May 2023	MGM Grand Garden Arena, Las Vegas, Nevada, U.S.	For vacant WBO super-flyweight title
28	Win	25–2 (1)	Norbelto Jimenez	UD	10	16 Oct 2022	Rod Laver Arena, Melbourne, Victoria, Australia	Won vacant WBO International super-flyweight title
27	Win	24–2 (1)	Alexander Espinoza	RTD	2 (8), 3:00	5 Jun 2022	Marvel Stadium, Melbourne, Victoria, Australia	
26	Win	23–2 (1)	Gilberto Mendoza	KO	8 (8), 2:29	9 Apr 2022	OC Fair & Event Center, Costa Mesa, California, U.S.	
25	Win	22–2 (1)	Froilan Saludar	UD	10	21 Dec 2021	The Star, Sydney, New South Wales, Australia	Won vacant WBO Oriental super-flyweight title
24	Loss	21–2 (1)	Joshua Franco	UD	12	14 Aug 2021	Hard Rock Hotel & Casino, Tulsa, Oklahoma, U.S.	For WBA (Regular) super-flyweight title
23	NC	21–1 (1)	Joshua Franco	NC	3 (12), 0:01	14 Nov 2020	MGM Grand Conference Center, Paradise, Nevada, U.S.	For WBA (Regular) super-flyweight title; Fight stopped after Franco suffered an eye injury from an accidental head clash
22	Loss	21–1	Joshua Franco	UD	12	23 Jun 2020	MGM Grand Conference Center, Las Vegas, Nevada, US	Lost WBA (Regular) super-flyweight title
21	Win	21–0	Elton Dharry	RTD	8 (12), 3:00	15 Nov 2019	Margaret Court Arena, Melbourne, Victoria, Australia	Won WBA interim super-flyweight title
20	Win	20–0	Selemani Bangaiza	TKO	2 (10), 1:57	15 Jun 2019	Seagulls Rugby League Club, Tweed Heads, New South Wales, Australia	
19	Win	19–0	Miguel Gonzalez	TKO	8 (12)	22 Mar 2019	Gran Arena Monticello, San Francisco de Mostazal, Chile	
18	Win	18–0	Luis Concepción	TKO	10 (10), 1:53	8 Sep 2018	Bendigo Stadium, Bendigo, Victoria, Australia	Retained WBA Oceania super-flyweight title
17	Win	17–0	Richard Claveras	UD	12	19 May 2018	Malvern Town Hall, Melbourne, Victoria, Australia	Retained WBA Oceania super-flyweight title
16	Win	16–0	Rene Dacquel	UD	12	24 Feb 2018	St Kilda Town Hall, Melbourne, Victoria, Australia	Retained WBA Oceania super-flyweight title; Won OPBF super-flyweight title
15	Win	15–0	Hashimu Zuberi	TKO	4 (12), 2:03	21 Oct 2017	Melbourne Park, Melbourne, Victoria, Australia	Retained WBA Oceania super-flyweight title; Won vacant Commonwealth super-flyweight title
14	Win	14–0	Raymond Tabugon	TKO	4 (10), 2:42	19 Aug 2017	Melbourne Park, Melbourne, Victoria, Australia	Won Silver OPBF and WBA Oceania super-flyweight titles
13	Win	13–0	Aramis Solis	KO	3 (10), 2:59	3 Jun 2017	Melbourne Park, Melbourne, Victoria, Australia	Retained WBA Oceania bantamweight title
12	Win	12–0	Renoel Pael	UD	8	3 Feb 2017	Adelaide Oval, Adelaide, South Australia, Australia	
11	Win	11–0	Carlos Ruben Dario Ruiz	KO	4 (10), 1:00	10 Dec 2016	Melbourne Park, Melbourne, Victoria, Australia	Retained WBA Oceania bantamweight title
10	Win	10–0	Jether Oliva	TKO	6 (10), 1:32	8 Oct 2016	Melbourne Park, Melbourne, Victoria, Australia	Retained WBA Oceania bantamweight title
9	Win	9–0	Markquil Salvana	TKO	1 (6), 1:54	3 Aug 2016	Hisense Arena, Melbourne, Victoria, Australia	
8	Win	8–0	Cris Alfante	UD	8	24 Jun 2016	Malvern Town Hall, Melbourne, Victoria, Australia	
7	Win	7–0	Ricardo David Ocampo	TKO	2 (6), 2:10	20 May 2016	The Melbourne Pavilion, Melbourne, Victoria, Australia	
6	Win	6–0	Ryohei Takahashi	UD	10	19 Mar 2016	Malvern Town Hall, Melbourne, Victoria, Australia	Won vacant WBA Oceania bantamweight title
5	Win	5–0	Roberto Lerio	KO	4 (10)	18 Dec 2015	Malvern Town Hall, Melbourne, Victoria, Australia	Won vacant Australian bantamweight title
4	Win	4–0	Ronerex Dalut	UD	6	19 Aug 2015	Hisense Arena, Melbourne, Victoria, Australia	
3	Win	3–0	Nilben Lottila	UD	4	6 Mar 2015	Royal Exhibition Building, Melbourne, Victoria, Australia	
2	Win	2–0	Jonathan Ligas	KO	1 (8), 3:00	12 Dec 2014	Royal Exhibition Building, Melbourne, Victoria, Australia	Won vacant Australia - Victoria State bantamweight title
1	Win	1–0	Willem Marahina	KO	3 (6), 1:09	31 Oct 2014	The Melbourne Pavilion, Melbourne, Victoria, Australia	

== See also ==
- List of male boxers
- Notable boxing families
- List of world super-flyweight boxing champions

Sporting positions
Regional boxing titles
Vacant Title last held by Shane Brock	ANBF Victoria bantamweight champion 12 December 2014 – 2015; Vacated	Vacant
Preceded by Roberto Lerio	Australian bantamweight champion 18 December 2015 – 2016; Vacated	Vacant Title next held by Robert Trigg
New title	WBA Oceania bantamweight champion 8 October 2016 – 2017; Vacated	Vacant Title next held by Jason Moloney
New title	WBA Oceania super-flyweight champion 19 August 2017 – 2018; Vacated	Vacant
Vacant Title last held by Rene Dacquel	OPBF Silver super-flyweight champion 19 August 2017 – 2017; Vacated	Vacant Title next held by Jakrawut Majungoen
Vacant Title last held by Jamie Conlan	Commonwealth super-flyweight champion 21 October 2017 – 2017; Vacated	Vacant Title next held by Tommy Frank
Preceded by Rene Dacquel	OPBF super-flyweight champion 24 February 2018 – 2018; Vacated	Vacant Title next held by Ryoji Fukunaga
Vacant Title last held by Wenfeng Ge	WBO Oriental super-flyweight champion 21 December 2021 – 20 May 2023; Lost bid for world title	Vacant Title next held by Takahiro Tai
Vacant Title last held by Donnie Nietes	WBO International super-flyweight champion 16 October 2022 – 20 May 2023; Lost bid for world title	Vacant
Vacant Title last held by Sikho Nqothole	WBO Global super-flyweight champion 9 December 2023 – 2025; Vacated	Vacant Title next held by Theophilous Kpakpo Allotey
World boxing titles
Vacant Title last held by Luis Concepción	WBA super-flyweight champion Interim title 15 November 2019 – 3 March 2020; Promoted	Vacant Title next held by David Jiménez
Preceded by Román González as Champion	WBA super-flyweight champion Regular title 3 March 2020 – 23 June 2020	Succeeded by Joshua Franco
Preceded by Willibaldo García	IBF super-flyweight champion 6 June 2026 – present	Incumbent
