= Devin Haney vs. George Kambosos Jr II =

Boxing match

Repeat or Revenge
- Date: 15 October 2022
- Venue: Rod Laver Arena, Melbourne, Victoria, Australia
- Title(s) on the line: WBA (Super), WBC, IBF, WBO and The Ring undisputed lightweight titles

Tale of the tape
Boxer	Devin Haney	George Kambosos Jr
Nickname	The Dream	Ferocious
Hometown	San Francisco, California, U.S.	Sydney, New South Wales, Australia
Pre-fight record	28–0 (15 KO)	20–1 (10 KO)
Age	23 years, 10 months	29 years, 4 months
Height	5 ft 8 in (173 cm)	5 ft 9 in (175 cm)
Weight	134.8 lb (61 kg)	134 lb (61 kg)
Style	Orthodox	Orthodox
Recognition	WBA (Super), WBC, IBF, WBO and The Ring Undisputed; Lightweight Champion	Former unified lightweight champion

Result
- Haney wins via 12-round unanimous decision (119-109, 118-110, 118-110)

Devin Haney vs. George Kambosos Jr. II, billed as Repeat or Revenge, was a professional boxing match contested on 15 October 2022, for the undisputed lightweight championship.

== Background ==
On 27 March, Kambosos and Haney struck a deal to fight after Lomachenko declined to fight Kambosos, opting to stay and fight for his country after Russia invaded Lomachenko's country of Ukraine. This deal included Haney signing a two-fight deal with Top Rank and Lou DiBella to fight exclusively on ESPN platforms. The deal included a rematch clause in the event that Haney won, with the rematch also taking place in Australia. Haney defeated Kambosos via unanimous decision on June 5 and Kambosos activated the rematch clause to take place on 16 October 2022, at Rod Laver Arena also in Melbourne.

== Fight Details ==
In the bout Haney retained his titles by beating Kambosos to a unanimous decision with the judges scoring it 119-109, 118-110 and 118-110 all in favour of Haney.

== Fight card ==
Confirmed bouts:

Main card (ESPN / ESPN+)
Weight class				Method	Round	Time	Notes
Lightweight	Devin Haney (c)	def.	George Kambosos Jr	UD	12/12		(Note: For WBA (Super), WBC, IBF, WBO, and The Ring lightweight titles)
Bantamweight	Jason Moloney	def.	Nawaphon Kaikanha	UD	12/12		(Note: WBC bantamweight title eliminator)
Super Flyweight	Andrew Moloney	def.	Norbelto Jimenez	UD	10/10		(Note: For vacant WBO International super flyweight title)
Super Bantamweight	Cherneka Johnson (c)	def.	Susie Ramadan	UD	10/10		(Note: For IBF female super bantamweight title)
Heavyweight	Faiga Opelu	def.	Hemi Ahio	TKO	4/8
Super Welterweight	Amari Jones	def.	Tej Pratap Singh	UD	6/6
Middleweight	Lorenzo Simpson	def.	Marcus Heywood	UD	8/8
Super Lightweight	John Mannu	vs	Adrian Sosa	MD	6/6
Cruiserweight	David Nyika	def.	Titi Motusaga	KO	2/6

== Broadcasting ==
Country	Broadcaster
Australia	Foxtel PPV
United Kingdom	Sky Sports
United States	ESPN+

== See also ==
- Boxing in Australia

Preceded by First bout	Devin Haney's bouts 15 October 2022	Succeeded by vs. Vasiliy Lomachenko
Preceded by First bout	George Kambosos Jr.'s bouts 15 October 2022	Succeeded by vs. Maxi Hughes
