= Teófimo López vs. George Kambosos Jr. =

Boxing match

- Date: November 27, 2021
- Venue: Hulu Theater, New York City, New York, U.S.
- Title(s) on the line: WBA (Super), IBF, WBO and The Ring lightweight titles

Tale of the tape
Boxer	(United States) Teófimo López	(Australia) George Kambosos Jr.
Nickname	"The Takeover"	"Ferocious"
Hometown	New York City, New York, U.S.	Sydney, New South Wales, Australia
Pre-fight record	16–0 (12 KOs)	19–0 (10 KOs)
Age	24 years, 3 months	28 years, 5 months
Height	5 ft 8 in (173 cm)	5 ft 9 in (175 cm)
Weight	135 lb (61 kg)	134 2/5 lb (61 kg)
Style	Orthodox	Orthodox
Recognition	WBA (Super), IBF, WBO, The Ring and TBRB; Lightweight Champion; The Ring No. 7 ranked pound-for-pound fighter	IBF; No. 1 Ranked Lightweight; WBO; No. 2 Ranked Lightweight; WBA; No. 10 Ranked Lightweight; TBRB; No. 8 Ranked Lightweight

Result
- Kambosos Jr. wins via 12-round split decision (115–111, 113–114, 115–112)

Teófimo López vs. George Kambosos Jr. was a lightweight professional boxing match between unified WBA (Super), IBF, WBO, and The Ring lightweight champion Teófimo López, and IBF mandatory challenger George Kambosos Jr. The fight took place on November 27, 2021, at the Hulu Theater, and was broadcast live exclusively on the streaming service DAZN. Kambosos Jr. won in one of the biggest upsets in recent boxing history.

== Background ==
After López's upset unanimous decision victory of Ukrainian two-time Olympic champion and pound-for-pound star Vasiliy Lomachenko, López was called out by Lomachenko for a rematch, which did not materialize. He was also called out by fellow American lightweight Devin Haney, as well as by Kambosos Jr., who had beaten Lee Selby to become the mandatory challenger to López's IBF title.

Relations between López and Top Rank turned sour, after Top Rank offered López $1.25 million to face Kambosos Jr., his contract minimum. With López and Top Rank not coming to an agreement, the fight went to a purse bid. On February 25, Triller won the purse bid for $6 million, to stage the fight between López and Kambosos Jr. On April 16, the fight was initially announced for June 5, 2021 at LoanDepot Park in Miami, with the undercard involving an exhibition bout between Kevin McBride, and former undisputed cruiserweight and undisputed heavyweight world champion Evander Holyfield. On May 12, the bout was rescheduled for June 19, with Holyfield vs. McBride being removed from the undercard, before once again being pushed back to August 14, due to López testing positive for COVID-19. As the Miami Marlins had a game scheduled that day at LoanDepot Park, a new venue was to be announced.

=== Unsuccessful negotiations ===
More complications arose: Triller attempted to stage the fight in the challenger Kambosos' home country of Australia. This proved controversial, because at the time Australia was in lockdown, which would have forced the champion López to arrive in the country at least 2 weeks beforehand and cut weight while in government-mandated isolation. The IBF took López's team's side and ruled against the move. On August 15, Triller co-founder Ryan Kavanaugh announced that he was trying to find a venue for the fight in Saudi Arabia or the United Arab Emirates. Over a week later, on August 23, it was announced that the fight would take place in López's home city, at the Hulu Theater in New York City on October 4, 2021. It was announced on September 26 that the fight had a new date and venue of October 16 at the Barclays Center in Brooklyn, New York. Early October it was announced that Triller would not go ahead with the fight on October 16, 2021, after almost $10 million spent on the promotional costs and no agreement reached regarding the date change.

=== Matchroom awarded broadcasting rights ===
On October 6, it transpired that the IBF had found Triller in default of its contract obligation to stage the fight, and that its rights would be awarded to the second highest bidder, Eddie Hearn's Matchroom, and the fight was shown live exclusively on the streaming service DAZN.

=== Build up ===
López was a 13–1 favourite heading into this fight.

== The fight ==
Kambosos knocked down the champion in the 1st round. Despite being knocked down himself in the 10th Kambosos won via split decision with two of the three judges scoring the contest 115–111 and 115–112 in his favor, and the other scoring it 114–113 for López.

== Fight card ==
Confirmed bouts:

Weight Class		vs.		Method	Round	Time	Notes
Lightweight	(Australia) George Kambosos Jr.	def.	(United States) Teófimo López (c)	SD	12		^{Note 1}
Super Featherweight	(Japan) Kenichi Ogawa	def.	(South Africa) Azinga Fuzile	UD	12		^{Note 2}
Featherweight	(United States) Raymond Ford	def.	(Puerto Rico) Felix Caraballo	TKO	8/10	2:10	^{Note 3}
Heavyweight	(China) Zhang Zhilei	def.	(United States) Craig Lewis	TKO	2/8	2:10
Super bantamweight	(Somalia) Ramla Ali	def.	(United States) Isela Vera	UD	4/4
Flyweight	(United States) Christina Cruz	def.	(United States) Maryguenn Vellinga	UD	6/6
Flyweight	(United States) Anthony Christopher Herrera	def.	(Mexico) Jonathan Daniel Herrera Tejeda	TKO	2/4	2:32	Pro debuts fight

^Note 1 For WBA (Super), IBF, WBO and The Ring lightweight titles
^Note 2 For vacant IBF Super featherweight title
^Note 3 For WBA Continental featherweight title

== Broadcasting ==
Country/Region	Broadcaster			
Country/Region	Free	Cable TV	PPV	Stream
Worldwide	—N/a			DAZN

Preceded by vs. Vasiliy Lomachenko	Teófimo López's bouts November 27, 2021	Succeeded by vs. Pedro Campa
Preceded by vs. Lee Selby	George Kambosos Jr.'s bouts November 27, 2021	Succeeded by vs. Devin Haney
Awards
Preceded by Vasiliy Lomachenko vs. Teófimo López	The Ring Upset of the Year; 2021	Succeeded by Mairis Briedis vs. Jai Opetaia
