= Ibrahim Balla =

Australian boxer (born 1990)

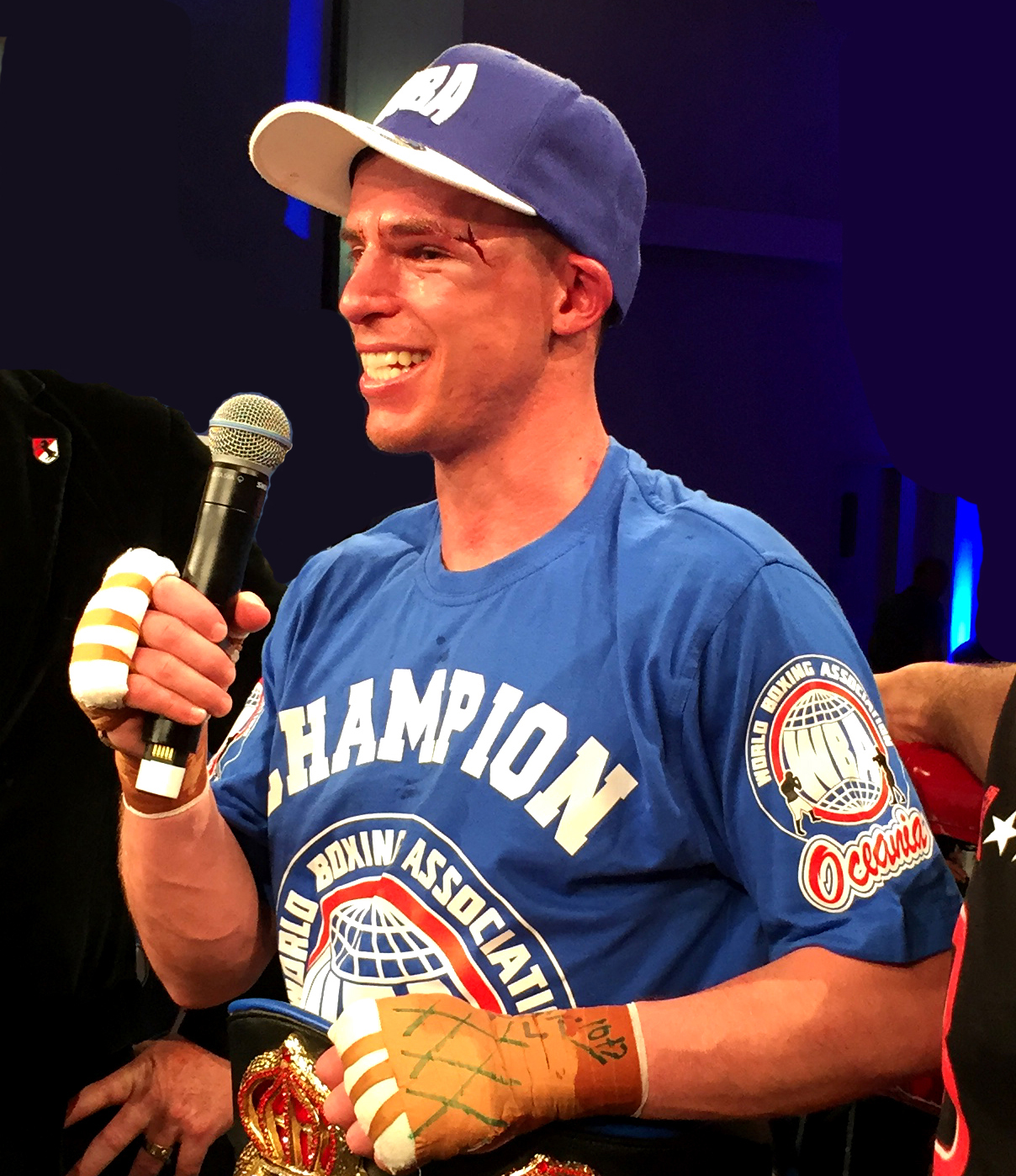

Personal information
- Nickname: "La Bala"
- Nationality: Australian
- Born: 1 October 1990 (age 36) Werribee, Victoria, Australia
- Height: 1.73 m (5 ft 8 in)
- Weight: Featherweight; Super Bantamweight

Boxing career
- Stance: Orthodox

Boxing record
- Total fights: 19
- Wins: 17
- Win by KO: 7
- Losses: 2
Medal record
Men's amateur boxing
Representing Australia
Commonwealth Youth Games
| Silver medal – second place | 2008 Pune | Boxing |

Ibrahim Balla (born 1 October 1990) is an Australian professional boxer. As an amateur, he competed at the 2010 Commonwealth Games and the 2012 Summer Olympics in the bantamweight division.

== Family background ==
Ibrahim Balla was born in Werribee to an Albanian family that immigrated from Albania to Australia prior to his birth. Balla is Muslim. Certain members of his family are boxers. His father Nuri was a Victorian amateur champion while his uncle Mitat Balla was an Australian amateur champion. Older brother Qamil Balla is also a professional boxer with a stellar amateur record. Younger brother Nasuf is also promising boxer / trainer.

Ibrahim Balla won his first Australian junior title in 2001 when he was just 11 years old. By 2012, he had won five Australian titles and a silver medal at the 2008 Commonwealth Youth Games in Pune, India. Victory in the Australian and Oceania titles in 2012 earned him a place in the Australian Olympic Team.

== Amateur career ==
As an amateur Ibrahim competed in 101 bouts, with 84 wins. He won multiple Victorian and Australian titles and represented Australia internationally.

2008 Commonwealth Youth Games – Silver Medal

2009 AIBA Presidents Cup – Bronze Medal (57 kg)

Finished Top 10 in the world 2012

Ibrahim joined the AIS as part of their Boxing program, this program gave scholarship holders access to world class Olympic-standard training facilities as well as internationally renowned sports science and sports medicine practitioners. Ibrahim spent 3 years under the national program.

=== London 2012 Summer Olympics ===
Ibrahim was selected to represent Australia at the London 2012 Summer Olympics. The Australian Olympic boxing team included notable current professional boxers WBO welterweight champion Jeff Horn, Damien Hooper, Australian team captain Luke Jackson, Cameron Hammond and ibrahim's roommate Jai Opetaia.

In the round of 32 Ibrahim faced Aboubakr Seddik Lbida, beating the Moroccan on a count back. In the second round, the round of 16, Ibrahim went down in a close fight to Bulgarian Detelin Dalakliev 14–10.

London Olympics 56 kg – Men Results
| Round of 32 Bout 11 | LBIDA, Aboubakr Seddik (MAR) | +16 – 16 | Win |
| Round of 16 Bout 6 | DALAKLIEV, Detelin (BUL) | 14–10 | Loss |
Final Placing 9 / 28

== Professional career ==
Ibrahim made his professional debut on 21 February 2013, defeating Jasper Buhat via first-round knockout.

Ibrahim is trained by former Australian super middleweight champion Lim Jeka of Jeka Boxing Academy and his strength and conditioning coach is Dirk Lamb. Team Balla training base is located at The Gym Yarraville.

=== Victoria State Super Bantamweight Champion (Australian) ===
Ibrahim won his first professional title on 25 June 2014 against Akrapong Nakthaem of Thailand at The Melbourne Pavilion Flemington. Nakthaem went down in rounds 1 and 2 with Ibrahim being declared the winner by TKO in round 2.

=== Australian Super Bantamweight Champion ===
Ibrahim won his second professional title in his first 10-round bout on 7 August 2015 against experienced Filipino boxer Roberto Lerio. Ibrahim won by unanimous points decision with the judges cards reading 100–90, 97–93 and 98–92.

=== Australian Featherweight Champion ===
On 18 March 2016 Ibrahim went up a weight class to face fellow Australian Emanuel Micallef. The fight was stopped 1.47 into the second round after a second knockdown with Ibrahim declared the winner by TKO.

=== WBO Oriental Featherweight Title ===
On 11 June 2016 Ibrahim experienced his first professional defeat at the hands of Filipino boxer Neil John Tabanao at Bendigo Stadium, Bendigo. Ibrahim had a disrupted training camp and weighed in over the featherweight limit of 126 pounds.

The fight was split on the judges' scorecards when Balla walked into a hard uppercut in the third round, followed by another. The referee took a long hard look at Balla and waved off the contest to save him from further punishment.

"I wasn’t at my best, mentally or physically for that fight," admits Balla. "You can make up a million excuses as to why you lost, but as a professional fighter I think the best way to look at it is he's beaten me, move on from there and become a better fighter."

"I try to make no excuses. I lost fair and square."

=== Balla vs. Lopez ===
On 19 August 2017 Ibrahim took on former WBC world title challenger Silvester Lopez, who recently took Tasmanian featherweight contender Luke Jackson the distance. In this fight Balla put on a boxing masterclass and boxed superbly. His jab was sharp and accurate, his body shots were on-point and he moved fluidly around the ring. "I thought I executed our game plan really well, with a little bit more sticking of the jab and setting everything up from there. A little bit of foot movement as well, which worked really well against Lopez. I was expecting a tough fight from him. He fought for a world title so he had a lot of ability and experience to him. I knew he was going to come out and try and focus on left hooking and body punching as that’s his strength. I was able to take away his strengths and use them against him."

=== WBA Oceania Featherweight Champion ===
In August 2017, it was announced that Ibrahim would fight the tough undefeated Tanzanian boxer Salimu Jengo "Mtango" (9–0, 6 KOs) for the vacant WBA Oceania Featherweight title at the Function Centre, Melbourne Park on 21 October. Ibrahim won the fight by unanimous points decision over 10 solid rounds.

In a post fight interview Ibrahim said "I'm feeling pretty good right about now," "I know that we’ve put a lot of hard work in throughout this year, so it’s very rewarding and satisfying right now."

Ibrahim had to overcome a number of cuts caused by head clashes throughout the bout that left him needing 15 stitches.

"We had a few headclashes," said Balla, who ended the contest with an inch long cut over his left eye. "Mtango was an awkward customer. But my team did a great job stopping the bleeding so it didn't worry me too much."

=== 2018 and beyond ===
12-month plan: "In twelve months' time I want to crack the top ten in the world. I want to have a serious opportunity, even be fighting for a world title. I just need the actual sparring experience. With my amateur record I've been all around the world – fighting world champions, Olympic gold medallists – but the seasoning really happens in the sparring in the gym. I believe I have the talent to not just mix it with the best but to beat the best. I just feel like a couple more fights and a little bit more experience and I'll be at that level."

== Professional boxing record ==
Professional Record Summary
| Fights | Win | Loss |
| 14 | 13 | 1 |
7 Wins by KO

| No | Result | Record | Opponent | Type | Round | Date | Location | Notes |
|---|---|---|---|---|---|---|---|---|
| 14 | Win | 13–1 | (Tanzania) Salimu Jengo | UD | 10 | 21 Oct 2017 | (Australia) Function Centre Melbourne Park, Melbourne | Won vacant WBA Oceania Featherweight Title |
| 13 | Win | 12–1 | (Philippines) Silvester Lopez | UD | 10 | 19 Aug 2017 | (Australia) Function Centre Melbourne Park, Melbourne | |
| 12 | Win | 11–1 | (Philippines) Vergil Puton | UD | 10 | 18 Mar 2017 | (Australia) Function Centre Melbourne Park, Melbourne | |
| 11 | Win | 10–1 | (Indonesia) Agus Kustiawan | KO | 5/10 | 10 Dec 2016 | (Australia) Function Centre Melbourne Park, Melbourne | |
| 10 | Loss | 9–1 | (Philippines) Neil John Tabanao | TKO | 3/10 | 11 Jun 2016 | (Australia) Bendigo Stadium, Bendigo | For vacant WBO Oriental Featherweight Title |
| 9 | Win | 9–0 | (Australia) Emanuel Micallef | TKO | 2/10 | 18 Mar 2016 | (Australia) The Melbourne Pavilion, Flemington | Won vacant Australian Featherweight Title |
| 8 | Win | 8–0 | (Philippines) Roberto Lerio | UD | 10 | 7 Aug 2015 | (Australia) The Melbourne Pavilion, Flemington | Won vacant Australian Super Bantamweight Title |
| 7 | Win | 7–0 | (Philippines) Alvin Bais | TKO | 2/6 | 5 Jun 2015 | (Australia) The Melbourne Pavilion, Flemington | |
| 6 | Win | 6–0 | (Thailand) Aekkawee Kaewmanee | UD | 6 | 15 Aug 2014 | (Australia) The Melbourne Pavilion, Flemington | |
| 5 | Win | 5–0 | (Thailand) Akrapong Nakthaem | TKO | 2/8 | 25 Jun 2014 | (Australia) The Melbourne Pavilion, Flemington | Won vacant Australia – Victoria State Super Bantamweight Title |
| 4 | Win | 4–0 | (Thailand) Kitirai Kheawswei | KO | 2/6 | 1 Mar 2014 | (Australia) The Melbourne Pavilion, Flemington | |
| 3 | Win | 3–0 | (Thailand) Anuntachai Somnuek | UD | 4 | 12 Sep 2013 | (Australia) The Melbourne Pavilion, Flemington | |
| 2 | Win | 2–0 | (Thailand) Ekkalak Saenchan | TKO | 1/4 | 25 Jul 2013 | (Australia) The Melbourne Pavilion, Flemington | |
| 1 | Win | 1–0 | (Philippines) Jasper Buhat | KO | 1/4 | 21 Feb 2013 | (Australia) The Melbourne Pavilion, Flemington | |
