= Devin Haney =

American boxer (born 1998)

- Haney in 2024

Personal information
- Nicknames: The Dream, Deebo
- Born: November 17, 1998 (age 28) San Francisco, California, U.S.
- Height: 5 ft 8 in (173 cm)
- Weight: Lightweight; Light welterweight; Welterweight

Boxing career
- Reach: 72 in (183 cm)
- Stance: Orthodox

Boxing record
- Total fights: 34
- Wins: 33
- Win by KO: 15
- No contests: 1

Devin Miles Haney (/ˈheɪni/ HAY-nee; born November 17, 1998) is an American professional boxer. He has held multiple world championships in three weight classes, including the World Boxing Organization (WBO) welterweight title since 2025, and previously the undisputed championship (Note: Four-belt era: World Boxing Association (WBA) (Super version), WBC, International Boxing Federation (IBF), and World Boxing Organization (WBO) titles) at lightweight from 2022 to 2023, and the World Boxing Council (WBC) super lightweight title from 2023 to 2024. He is the youngest boxer in history to hold an undisputed championship.

Haney was named Sports Illustrated's Fighter of the Year in 2023.

== Early life ==
Haney was born in San Francisco and lived in Oakland, California, as a child, but moved to Las Vegas with his father, Bill Haney, at the age of 14. He started boxing at the age of seven. Haney is a practicing Muslim.

== Professional career ==
=== Lightweight ===
==== Early career ====
On February 2, 2018, Haney was scheduled to fight Harmonito Dela Torre in an eight-round opening bout. Dela Torre had problems obtaining a travel visa and subsequently withdrew from the fight. Unable to find an opponent, the date was scrapped.

On January 11, 2019, Haney defeated Xolisani Ndongeni on the way to a 10-round unanimous decision win.

On May 25, 2019, Haney defeated Antonio Moran via a seventh-round knockout, in his first match under the Matchroom banner.

On September 13, 2019, Haney defeated Zaur Abdullaev (11–0) to win the vacant WBC interim lightweight title.

==== WBC lightweight champion ====
In October 2019, Haney became the WBC lightweight champion as he was elevated, after the previous WBC lightweight champion Vasiliy Lomachenko was promoted to "Franchise Champion" by the WBC.

==== Haney vs. Santiago ====
On the undercard of KSI vs. Logan Paul II in November 2019, Haney made his first title defense against Alfredo Santiago (12–0), and won by unanimous decision. He injured his shoulder during the fight, requiring surgery that would keep him out until the summer of 2020. He maintained the title "champion in recess."

==== Haney vs. Gamboa ====
On October 2, 2020, it was revealed that Haney would make the second defense of his WBC lightweight title against veteran 39-year-old former featherweight title holder Yuriorkis Gamboa, on November 7, 2020. The bout was held at the Hard Rock Live in Hollywood, Florida, and was broadcast by DAZN. Most media members predicted an easy victory for the reigning champion, which was reflected in the betting odds as well, with most odds-makers having Haney as a -5000 favorite. Haney won the fight by a dominant unanimous decision, with two of the judges awarding him every single round of the fight, while the third judge scored it 118–109 in favor of Haney. Gamboa was deducted a point in the eleventh round for holding. Haney out-landed Gamboa 133 to 84 in total punches, and 82 to 63 in power punches landed.

==== Haney vs. Linares ====
In what was seen by many as Haney's toughest test of his career so far, Haney made the third defense of his WBC lightweight title against veteran 36-year-old former three-weight world champion Jorge Linares on May 29, 2021. He won by unanimous decision with the judges scoring the bout 116–112, 116–112, 115–113 in his favor. Haney controlled the action for most of the fight, but was hurt when Linares caught him with a powerful right-left combination toward the end of the tenth round. Haney survived the final two rounds largely by tying Linares up and negating his opponent's attempts at trying to engage with him. The crowd voiced their displeasure with what they perceived as excessive clinching by booing Haney when he jumped up on the ropes in celebration immediately after the final bell, as well as booing during the announcement of the official decision.

==== Haney vs. Diaz ====
Joseph Diaz had been scheduled to defend his WBC interim lightweight title against Ryan García on November 27, 2021, until García withdrew from the fight due to a hand injury. This led to back and forth on social media between Haney and Diaz, culminating in an official announcement on November 3 that Diaz would now be challenging for Haney's full world title on December 4, instead of defending his interim title against García. On the night, Haney defeated Diaz by unanimous decision, with scores of 117–111, 117–111, 116–112 in his favor. After the fight, the victor announced his desire to face unified champion George Kambosos Jr. for all four major world titles in the lightweight division, stating, "Let's do it for all the belts. The real undisputed."

==== Haney vs. Kambosos Jr. ====
In front of a sold-out crowd in Melbourne, Australia in June 2022, Haney defeated George Kambosos Jr. by outpointing and outboxing the Australian fighter to become the first undisputed lightweight champion in the four-belt era. The judges scored the bout 116–112, 116–112, 118–110, all in favor of Haney. The deal for the fight included an automatic rematch clause which Kambosos exercised, with the rematch occurring in October 2022 in Australia.

==== Haney vs. Kambosos Jr. II ====
Devin Haney and George Kambosos Jr. met in their rematch at Rod Laver Arena in Melbourne, Australia on October 16, 2022. Haney defeated Kambosos via unanimous decision with the scores of 118–110 (twice) and 119–109.

==== Haney vs. Lomachenko ====
On March 29, 2023, it was confirmed that Haney would make a second defense of his undisputed lightweight titles against veteran 35-year-old former unified lightweight champion Vasiliy Lomachenko on May 20, 2023, at the MGM Grand Garden Arena in Paradise, Nevada, U.S.

With Lomachenko coming in as the underdog for the first time in his career, much of the bout turned out to be closely contested, with both men finding success, Lomachenko scoring with clean combinations to the head, while Haney countered consistently with solid body shots. Late in the fight, Lomachenko became increasingly dominant, finding particular success in the 10th and 11th rounds. However, Haney rallied to win the final round on all three judges' scorecards.

Haney won the fight by controversial decision. However, the decision was greatly disputed, as many onlookers felt Lomachenko had done enough to win, including fellow boxers Shakur Stevenson and Jorge Linares, who had previously predicted a Haney victory. Judge Dave Moretti's scorecard, giving round 10 to Haney despite Lomachenko dominating that round, was heavily criticised. Others argued that as the fight had been close, a narrow result for Haney was not unreasonable. CompuBox punch stats suggested Haney had landed 110 of 405 punches thrown (27%), while Lomachenko landed 124 of 564 (22%), with both boxers outlanding the other in five rounds each, the other two rounds being even. Lomachenko believed he had won and his team subsequently stated they would file an appeal regarding the result. Haney on his part praised Lomachenko, calling him his toughest opponent yet.

Regardless of the result, the fight and the performances of both men were widely praised. It was described by multiple accounts as "thrilling", with Lomachenko's display against a substantially younger and larger opponent being highly lauded. Afterwards, Haney was fined $25,000 for violently shoving Lomachenko during the weigh-in faceoffs.

===== Controversy =====
In April 2020, Haney claimed that he could beat unified lightweight champion Vasiliy Lomachenko during an interview with 78SportsTV. When asked if would "end the hype of Loma", Haney said, "I'll tell you this. I will never lose to a white boy in my life. I don't care what nobody got to say. Fight a white boy 10 times, I'm going to beat him 10 times." Haney was criticized for the comment. After the fight, Haney announced on Twitter, "I'm not racist and I never will be a racist. I'm chasing greatness." He also said he spoke with WBC president Mauricio Sulaimán and "confirmed to him directly my commitment to be a role model and my absolute rejection of discrimination of any kind." Haney's comments were compared to Bernard Hopkins' declaration that he would "never let a white boy beat me" before his loss to Joe Calzaghe.

=== Super lightweight ===
==== Haney vs. Prograis ====
On December 9, 2023, in an almost sold-out Chase Center in San Francisco, California, Haney moved up a weight class and challenged 35 year old Regis Prograis for the WBC super lightweight title.

Despite it being his first fight at super lightweight, Haney dominated Prograis from start to finish, winning every round on all three judges' scorecards and scoring a knockdown in the third round from a right hand. Haney staggered Prograis several more times in the middle rounds, but seemed reluctant to go for the finish and instead relied on his winning formula of attacking and retreating. Prograis, who received a cut over his nose and swelling around his eye, had no answers for Haney, landing just 36 punches to Haney's 129, according to CompuBox.

All three judges scored the fight 120–107 as Haney added another belt to become a two-weight world champion at the age of 25.

==== Haney vs. Garcia ====
Haney vs Ryan Garcia was signed for April 20, 2024 in Brooklyn, New York, for the WBC super lightweight title. Two days before the fight, Garcia agreed to a wager with Haney that Garcia would pay $500,000 for every pound over the limit should he miss weight. Garcia weighed in over the limit at 143.2 lbs, making the fight a non-title fight and would forfeit up to $600,000 of his purse to Haney.

Haney was knocked down three times by Garcia during the 12 round contest, and lost via majority-decision. One judge scored the bout 112–112 but was overruled by scores of 114–110 and 115–109 for Garcia, who outlanded Haney 106–87 in total punches and 95–45 in power punches, according to CompuBox. On June 20, the bout was changed to a no contest, Garcia was fined $1.1 million and suspended for a year due to using Ostarine, after taking the plea deal over taking it to trial.

On June 24, 2024 it was announced that Devin Haney requested the WBC for "Champion in Recess" status. The WBC unanimously approved his request.

=== Welterweight ===
==== Haney vs. Ramirez ====
On January 4, 2025, it was reported that Haney would make his ring return on March 25, 2025. Adrien Broner was rumored as his possible opponent. Later the same month, it was announced that Haney would face José Ramírez in May. The fight took place in Times Square, New York, on 2 May 2025, with Haney winning by unanimous decision.

==== Haney vs. Norman Jr. ====
On June 25, Haney and then-undefeated WBO welterweight champion Brian Norman Jr. (28-0 (2 NC), 22 KOs) verbally agreed to a fight. A week prior, Norman secured a knockout victory in Japan against Jin Sasaki, successfully defending his title. Four days later, Tuki Alalshikh announced the fight headline a super card in Riyadh, later in the year. The card, billed as "Ring IV" was formally announced to take place on November 22, 2025. Norman expressed no surprise at Haney's selection of him as an opponent. He commended Haney's determination and resilience, noting that he never shied away from a challenge. Norman believed he would achieve a stoppage win, but he thought his ring IQ, technical skills, and other attributes were not fully appreciated. He was prepared to display his abilities on a significant platform. A confrontation occurred on July 12 in New York, involving Haney's security guard, referred to as Big Tank. During the incident, Big Tank perceived Norman to be too close to Haney and grabbed his shirt, resulting in a rip. Norman then executed a hip toss on Big Tank using one arm. Video footage of the incident later circulated on social media. Haney expressed that he was not worried about Norman's recent series of stoppage victories. He indicated that Norman had not competed against opponents of the same caliber as those he had faced. In August, the WBO placed Haney at #1 in their welterweight rankings, which meant that Norman's defense would count as a mandatory defense. Bill Haney had long predicted that 147 pounds would be the ideal weight for his son. Haney was also surprised at how long he managed to stay at lightweight. Brian Norman Sr. and Bill Haney had an intense verbal confrontation during the last press conference. During the face off, Norman Jr. appeared calm and composed, while Haney displayed a more animated demeanor. Norman weighed 146 pounds and Haney came in at 146.6 pounds.

On November 22 at the anb Arena in Riyadh, Haney defeated Norman via unanimous decision to capture the WBO welterweight title. From the first round on, Haney came out more aggressively than expected, forcing Norman on the back foot. Midway through the second round, Haney stunned Norman with a left hook, which he followed with a right cross that dropped Norman and severely damaged his nose. Haney maintained this aggressive pace for the next several rounds, with a tentative Norman struggling to close the distance and land anything meaningful. The second half of the fight saw Norman finding more success as Haney took his foot off of the gas, but the last two rounds saw Haney retake control as a badly fatigued Norman started to smother his own shots. In the end, Haney won by scores of 114-113, 117-110, and 116-111, becoming a three-division world champion and handing Norman his first loss. CompuBox showed that Haney landed 70 of 271 punches thrown (26%) and Norman landed only 59 of his 399 (15%).

==== Failed negotiations ====
On December 15, 2025, Haney stated his interest in fighting IBF champion Lewis Crocker in a welterweight unification bout. Eddie Hearn, Crocker's promoter, was also in support of a possible unification in the near future. A day later, Crocker also suggested a fight with Haney would be ideal next. He told DAZN, “That’s the biggest fight in the division. There are plenty of options, but if you’re asking me, that’s the fight that I’d want next.” In January 2026, Haney said he was interested in a fight against Keyshawn Davis (13–0, 9 KOs). This came after Davis told Inside the Ring, that he was willing to move up to welterweight after his junior welterweight fight on January 31.

On March 5, 2026, WBA champion Rolly Romero (17–2, 13 KOs) announced that he had signed to fight Haney on May 30 at the Barclays Center in New York in a unification bout under the Premier Boxing Champions banner on PPV. Despite the announcement, Haney's team was still reviewing the financial terms. Romero put out a confrontational statement on social media, claiming he was fully committed and criticizing the Haney camp as “soft and full of lies.” There was also a slight issue surrounding Romero's mandatory challenger, Shakhram Giyasov (17−0, 10 KOs). His team criticized Romero for avoiding the mandatory. Giyasov had not fought since April 2025 and was unwilling to take a step-aside agreement. A 30-day mandatory notice was given in October 2025, when purse bids occurred. Giyasov’s manager, Vadim Kornilov, was pursuing legal action to enforce the mandatory. He was frustrated that Romero had been negotiating with multiple fighters rather than committing to a fight against Giyasov. On March 10, Haney said, “I can’t say that it’s a done deal yet. We are working on it. I think that it’s very likely that it will happen." By March 26, the fight faced uncertainty due to interim champion Giyasov demanding a title shot that he had been waiting for nearly three years. By April 4, negotiations had broken down after the two boxers failed to reach an agreement on financial terms. Haney initially said the offer from Romero was "very fair" but suggested changes to minor details. He then stated he was completely dissatisfied with the terms. According to Romero, he offered a 50/50 split, considering it a fair offer since it was a unification bout. He stated he was heavily promoting the bout on his own and criticized Haney's promotional efforts, suggesting he lacked the ability to promote fights. He then accused Haney of being afraid to fight. Haney revealed the talks collapsed due to the deal structure being unfair, which was based on a revenue-first model. It proposed that the boxers would only be paid after $6 million in event expenses were covered, and then the remaining revenue would be split 50/50 between the two boxers. Haney believed his status in the sport entitled him to a higher share, also taking aim at the fact that Romero had never been paid a $2 million purse for a single fight.

On April 15, Shakur Stevenson (25–0, 11 KOs) stated that he would agree to a fight with Haney only if it were contested at a 144-pound catchweight. Stevenson argued that the bout did not require a title to be at stake and stated that it was capable of selling out a large venue, describing it as a "tremendous fight." On June 2, it was reported that the WBO was likely to order Haney to defend his welterweight title against Keyshawn Davis. Davis had been elevated to the No. 1 position in the WBO rankings, making him Haney’s mandatory challenger, with the defense expected to take place in August 2026. Haney publicly challenged Davis to a fight following Davis’s elevation to the No. 1 position. Haney called for the bout on social media, writing "Let’s do it, Keyshawn." On June 10, Haney and Stevenson publicly agreed to a potential bout at a 144‑pound catchweight following an exchange on social media. Stevenson had proposed the weight as a compromise between their respective divisions, and Haney accepted, asking if the fight would proceed under those terms, to which Stevenson responded "Yes."

On June 12, the WBO stated that Haney was required to defend his title against Davis or face being stripped of the championship. On June 30, the WBO officially ordered Haney vs. Keyshawn Davis, giving both teams 20 days to negotiate a fight, with a purse bid to follow if no deal was made, using a 75–25 split in Haney’s favor. A purse bid was held on July 30, which was won by Davis' promoter Top Rank, who put in a winning bid of $8.55 million, comfortably beating the only other bid from Teofimo Lopez's Takeover Promotions, which offered $2.35 million. The bout was targeted for October 3, with the Barclays Center, State Farm Arena and Michelob ULTRA Arena as potential venues. Under WBO rules, the purse split meant that Haney would receive $6.4 million (75%) and Davis' purse would be $2.1 million (25%). A day later, Davis withdrew from the fight after rejecting the mandated 25% share of the purse bid. Following Davis's withdrawal, the WBO stated that "the matter will now be referred to the WBO Championship Committee and Ratings Committee for the appropriate ruling under the WBO World Championship Rules and Regulations." According to reports, that Davis had previously declined a reported $3 million offer from Top Rank and was seeking a $5 million net purse after management fees. Davis had never reportedly earned more than $1 million for a fight. Negotiations with Stevenson then opened up again. There was a back and forth for some months. In October, negotiations collapsed despite both parties seemingly agreeing to a 145-pound catchweight. Stevenson alleged that Haney's team insisted on the welterweight limit, saying the negotiations were a 'big waste of time'. Haney disputed these claims, stating, 'I agreed to 145', then accusing Stevenson's camp of delays. Reports suggested Haney would instead pursue a unification fight against Liam Paro, the IBF champion.

==== Signing with DAZN ====
On October 23, 2026, Haney, through Devin Haney Promotions, signed an exclusive multi-fight contract with streaming service DAZN. In a statement, he said, “I’m at a point in my career where I want the biggest challenges and the fights the fans want to see. I’m excited to partner with DAZN. This agreement removes any doubt or uncertainty about my ability to make major fights in boxing. I’m in position to fight anyone, and I’m focused, motivated, and ready for whoever is next.”

==== Haney vs. Paro ====
A fight between Haney and Liam Paro was first discussed by promoter Eddie Hearn in August 2024. He was hoping to make the fight in December 2024, in Australia. Talks once again began in August 2026 after the Haney-Davis negotiations fell apart. Paro (28–1, 16 KOs), now the IBF champion, and his promotional team No Limit began taks with Haney's representatives. There was no issues with the WBO, who stated they would be open to a request from Haney for a unification fight, whether it be against Paro or Stevenson. In October, both boxers agreed terms for a unification bout. On November 5, the unification fight between Haney and Paro was officially announced, to take place at the Chase Center in San Francisco on December 19, streaming exclusively on DAZN. The event was to be co-promoted by Top Rank. On November 20, a dispute arose after Haney had not yet enrolled in VADA testing. Paro publicly questioned the delay, citing Haney's previous advocacy of anti-doping measures, while a source close to negotiations suggested that the fight was "in jeopardy" if the issue remained unresolved. Haney responded that the contest would be his "14th consecutive fight using VADA testing" and said that he intended to enrol in the programme.

== Boxing style ==
Haney is an out-boxer whose style is not built on raw power but outmanoeuvres, frustrates, and systematically breaks down opponents. His defense is a cornerstone, featuring impressive head movement, a Philly Shell against orthodox boxers, a high guard against southpaw fighters, and exceptional distance management. He uses his 71-inch reach to keep opponents at bay and avoids nearly half of all punches thrown at him.

He excels at turning defense into offense by using precise timing to capitalize on opponents' mistakes. He often baits them into committing before landing accurate counter-shots. His agile footwork allows him to control the pace and location of the fight. He constantly moves, creates angles, and pivots to evade attacks and land from advantageous positions.

He is a strategic fighter who studies opponents, formulates specific game plans, and can adjust his tactics mid-fight. He maintains composure under pressure. His primary tools are a sharp and accurate jab (used to control distance and set up combinations) and effective body punching to wear opponents down over the rounds.

== Personal life ==
Leena Sayed welcomed their daughter, Khrome Iman Haney, on January 8, 2025.

In early July 2025, it was reported by TMZ that Leena Sayed, the mother of Haney's five-month-old daughter, Khrome, initiated proceedings for a restraining order in Nevada against Haney. According to TMZ, a judge issued a temporary order of protection on Monday, and both parties are scheduled to appear in court on July 22. The judge has also determined that Haney is not permitted to visit his daughter until the court date. A principal allegation asserted that in December 2024, Haney allegedly physically pushed her during a period when she was nine months pregnant, subsequent to her refusal to surrender her cell phone. This incident, alongside additional claims of abuse, constituted the foundation of her legal proceedings. In response, Haney’s legal representatives categorically rejected the abuse allegations, characterizing them as unfounded. In August 2025, Haney initiated a separate legal action against Sayed, alleging extortion and asserting that she threatened to harm his reputation and his visitation rights concerning their daughter, Khrome. Additionally, he brought a claim for intentional infliction of emotional distress, seeking damages for what he asserted is malicious conduct. Sayed's attorney, Mark Vincent Kaplan, stated that his client was only seeking what the law mandates Haney to pay for child support.

== Professional boxing record ==
34 fights	33 wins	0 losses
By knockout	15	0
By decision	18	0
No contests	1	

No.	Result	Record	Opponent	Type	Round, time	Date	Location	Notes
34	Win	33–0 (1)	Brian Norman Jr.	UD	12	Nov 22, 2025	ANB Arena, Riyadh, Saudi Arabia	Won WBO welterweight title
33	Win	32–0 (1)	José Ramírez	UD	12	May 2, 2025	Times Square, New York City, New York, U.S.	
32	NC	31–0 (1)	Ryan Garcia	NC	12	Apr 20, 2024	Barclays Center, New York City, New York, U.S.	WBC super lightweight title not at stake as Garcia missed weight; Originally MD win for Garcia, later ruled a no contest after Garcia failed a drug test
31	Win	31–0	Regis Prograis	UD	12	Dec 9, 2023	Chase Center, San Francisco, California, U.S.	Won WBC super lightweight title
30	Win	30–0	Vasiliy Lomachenko	UD	12	May 20, 2023	MGM Grand Garden Arena, Paradise, Nevada, U.S.	Retained WBA (Super), WBC, IBF, WBO, and The Ring lightweight titles
29	Win	29–0	George Kambosos Jr.	UD	12	Oct 16, 2022	Rod Laver Arena, Melbourne, Australia	Retained WBA (Super), WBC, IBF, WBO, and The Ring lightweight titles
28	Win	28–0	George Kambosos Jr.	UD	12	Jun 5, 2022	Docklands Stadium, Melbourne, Australia	Retained WBC lightweight title; Won WBA (Super), IBF, WBO, and The Ring lightweight titles
27	Win	27–0	Joseph Diaz Jr.	UD	12	Dec 4, 2021	MGM Grand Garden Arena, Paradise, Nevada, U.S.	Retained WBC lightweight title
26	Win	26–0	Jorge Linares	UD	12	May 29, 2021	Michelob Ultra Arena, Paradise, Nevada, U.S.	Retained WBC lightweight title
25	Win	25–0	Yuriorkis Gamboa	UD	12	Nov 7, 2020	Hard Rock Live, Hollywood, Florida, U.S.	Retained WBC lightweight title
24	Win	24–0	Alfredo Santiago	UD	12	Nov 9, 2019	Staples Center, Los Angeles, California, U.S.	Retained WBC lightweight title
23	Win	23–0	Zaur Abdullaev	RTD	4 (12), 3:00	Sep 13, 2019	Hulu Theater, New York City, New York, U.S.	Won vacant WBC interim lightweight title
22	Win	22–0	Antonio Moran	KO	7 (12), 2:32	May 25, 2019	MGM National Harbor, Oxon Hill, Maryland, U.S.	Retained WBC International and WBO Inter-Continental lightweight titles; Won vacant WBA International lightweight title
21	Win	21–0	Xolisani Ndongeni	UD	10	Jan 11, 2019	StageWorks, Shreveport, Louisiana, U.S.	Won vacant WBC International and WBO Inter-Continental lightweight titles
20	Win	20–0	Juan Carlos Burgos	UD	10	Sep 28, 2018	Pechanga Resort & Casino, Temecula, California, U.S.	Won vacant IBF North American lightweight title
19	Win	19–0	Mason Menard	RTD	9 (10), 3:00	May 11, 2018	2300 Arena, Philadelphia, Pennsylvania, U.S.	Won vacant USBA lightweight title
18	Win	18–0	Hamza Sempewo	TKO	5 (6), 1:39	Nov 4, 2017	Buckhead Fight Club, Atlanta, Georgia, U.S.	
17	Win	17–0	Enrique Tinoco	UD	8	Sep 22, 2017	SugarHouse Casino, Philadelphia, Pennsylvania, U.S.	
16	Win	16–0	Miguel Angel Perez Aispuro	KO	5 (8), 1:51	Jun 24, 2017	Agua Caliente Casino Resort Spa, Rancho Mirage, California, U.S.	
15	Win	15–0	Hector Garcia	UD	8	Apr 15, 2017	Salon Sindicato Alba Roja, Tijuana, Mexico	
14	Win	14–0	Maximino Toala	TKO	4 (10), 1:34	Mar 4, 2017	Salon Sindicato Alba Roja, Tijuana, Mexico	Won vacant WBC Youth lightweight title
13	Win	13–0	Daniel Armando Valenzuela	KO	2 (8), 0:56	Jan 28, 2017	AS Boxing Arena, Tijuana, Mexico	
12	Win	12–0	Odilon Rivera Meza	TKO	1 (8), 1:49	Jan 12, 2017	Escape Bar, Tijuana, Mexico	
11	Win	11–0	Carlos Antonio Avila	TKO	5 (6), 1:45	Oct 21, 2016	Grand Hotel, Tijuana, Mexico	
10	Win	10–0	Mike Fowler	TKO	5 (6), 1:19	Sep 15, 2016	2300 Arena, Philadelphia, Pennsylvania, U.S.	
9	Win	9–0	Carlos Castillo	UD	6	Aug 27, 2016	The Meadows Racetrack and Casino, Washington, Pennsylvania, U.S.	
8	Win	8–0	Javier Meraz	TKO	2 (6), 1:45	Aug 12, 2016	Grand Hotel, Tijuana, Mexico	
7	Win	7–0	Clay Burns	UD	6	Jun 25, 2016	Belle of Baton Rouge, Baton Rouge, Louisiana, U.S.	
6	Win	6–0	Jairo Fernandez Vargas	TKO	4 (6), 1:34	May 21, 2016	Downtown Las Vegas Event Center, Las Vegas, Nevada, U.S.	
5	Win	5–0	Rafael Vazquez	UD	4	Apr 9, 2016	MGM Grand Garden Arena, Paradise, Nevada, U.S.	
4	Win	4–0	Roman Melendez	TKO	1 (6), 2:26	Mar 19, 2016	Billar El Perro Salado, Tijuana, Mexico	
3	Win	3–0	Jorge Edgar Sillas	UD	6	Feb 20, 2016	Billar El Perro Salado, Tijuana, Mexico	
2	Win	2–0	Jose Iniguez	TKO	1 (4), 1:36	Dec 18, 2015	Billar El Perro Salado, Tijuana, Mexico	
1	Win	1–0	Gonzalo Lopez	TKO	1 (4), 0:33	Dec 11, 2015	Billar El Perro Salado, Tijuana, Mexico	

== Titles in boxing ==
=== Major world titles ===
- WBA (Super) lightweight champion (135 lbs)
- WBC lightweight champion (135 lbs) (2x)
- IBF lightweight champion (135 lbs)
- WBO lightweight champion (135 lbs)
- WBC light welterweight champion (140 lbs)
- WBO welterweight champion (147 lbs)

=== The Ring magazine titles ===
- The Ring lightweight champion (135 lbs)

=== Interim world titles ===
- WBC interim lightweight champion (135 lbs)

=== Minor world titles ===
- WBC Youth lightweight champion (135 lbs)

=== Regional/International titles ===
- WBA International lightweight champion (135 lbs)
- WBC International lightweight champion (135 lbs)
- USBA lightweight champion (135 lbs)
- IBF North American lightweight champion (135 lbs)
- WBO Inter-Continental lightweight champion (135 lbs)

=== Undisputed titles ===
- Undisputed lightweight champion (135 lbs)

== Pay-per-view bouts ==
United States
No.	Date	Fight	Buys	Network	Revenue
1	May 20, 2023	Haney vs. Lomachenko	150,000	ESPN	$9,000,000
2	December 9, 2023	Haney vs. Prograis	55,000	DAZN	$3,450,000
3	April 20, 2024	Haney vs. Garcia	500,000	DAZN	$35,000,000
	Total sales		705,000		$47,450,000

== See also ==
- List of world lightweight boxing champions
- List of world light-welterweight boxing champions
- List of world welterweight boxing champions
- List of boxing triple champions

== Notes ==
Sporting positions
Regional boxing titles
Vacant Title last held by Ivan Redkach	USBA lightweight champion May 11, 2018 – September 2018; Vacated	Vacant Title next held by Teófimo López
New title	IBF North American lightweight champion September 28, 2018 – December 2018; Vacated	Vacant Title next held by Lucas Bahdi
Vacant Title last held by Hurricane Futa	WBC International lightweight champion January 11, 2019 – July 2019; Vacated	Vacant Title next held by Viktor Kotochigov
Vacant Title last held by Daud Yordan	WBO Inter-Continental lightweight champion January 11, 2019 – July 2019; Vacated	Vacant Title next held by Thomas Mattice
Vacant Title last held by Joe Cordina	WBA International lightweight champion May 25, 2019 – August 2019; Vacated	Vacant Title next held by James Tennyson
World boxing titles
Vacant Title last held by Omar Figueroa Jr.	WBC lightweight champion Interim title September 13, 2019 – October 23, 2019; Promoted	Vacant Title next held by Ryan Garcia
Preceded by Vasiliy Lomachenko status changed	WBC lightweight champion October 23, 2019 – December 12, 2019; Status changed	Vacant Title next held by Himself
Vacant Title last held by Himself	WBC lightweight champion April 22, 2020 – August 1, 2023; Status changed	Vacant Title next held by Shakur Stevenson
Preceded by George Kambosos Jr.	WBA lightweight champion Super title June 5, 2022 – November 29, 2023; Vacated	Title discontinued
Preceded by George Kambosos Jr.	IBF lightweight champion June 5, 2022 – November 29, 2023; Vacated	Vacant Title next held by Vasiliy Lomachenko
Preceded by George Kambosos Jr.	WBO lightweight champion June 5, 2022 – November 29, 2023; Vacated	Vacant Title next held by Denys Berinchyk
Preceded by George Kambosos Jr.	The Ring lightweight champion June 5, 2022 – November 29, 2023; Vacated	Vacant
Vacant Title last held by Pernell Whitaker	Undisputed lightweight champion June 5, 2022 – August 1, 2023; Titles fragmented	Vacant
Preceded by Regis Prograis	WBC super lightweight champion December 9, 2023 – June 24, 2024; Status changed	Succeeded by Alberto Puello
Preceded by Brian Norman Jr.	WBO welterweight champion November 22, 2025 – present	Incumbent
Honorary boxing titles
Vacant Title last held by Jorge Linares	WBC lightweight champion In recess December 12, 2019 – April 22, 2020; Reinstated	Vacant Title next held by Himself
Vacant Title last held by Himself	WBC lightweight champion In recess August 1, 2023 – November 29, 2023; Vacated	Vacant
Vacant Title last held by Timothy Bradley	WBC super lightweight champion In recess June 24, 2024 – February 2025; Vacated	Vacant
