= Qamil Balla =

Australian boxer (born 1989)

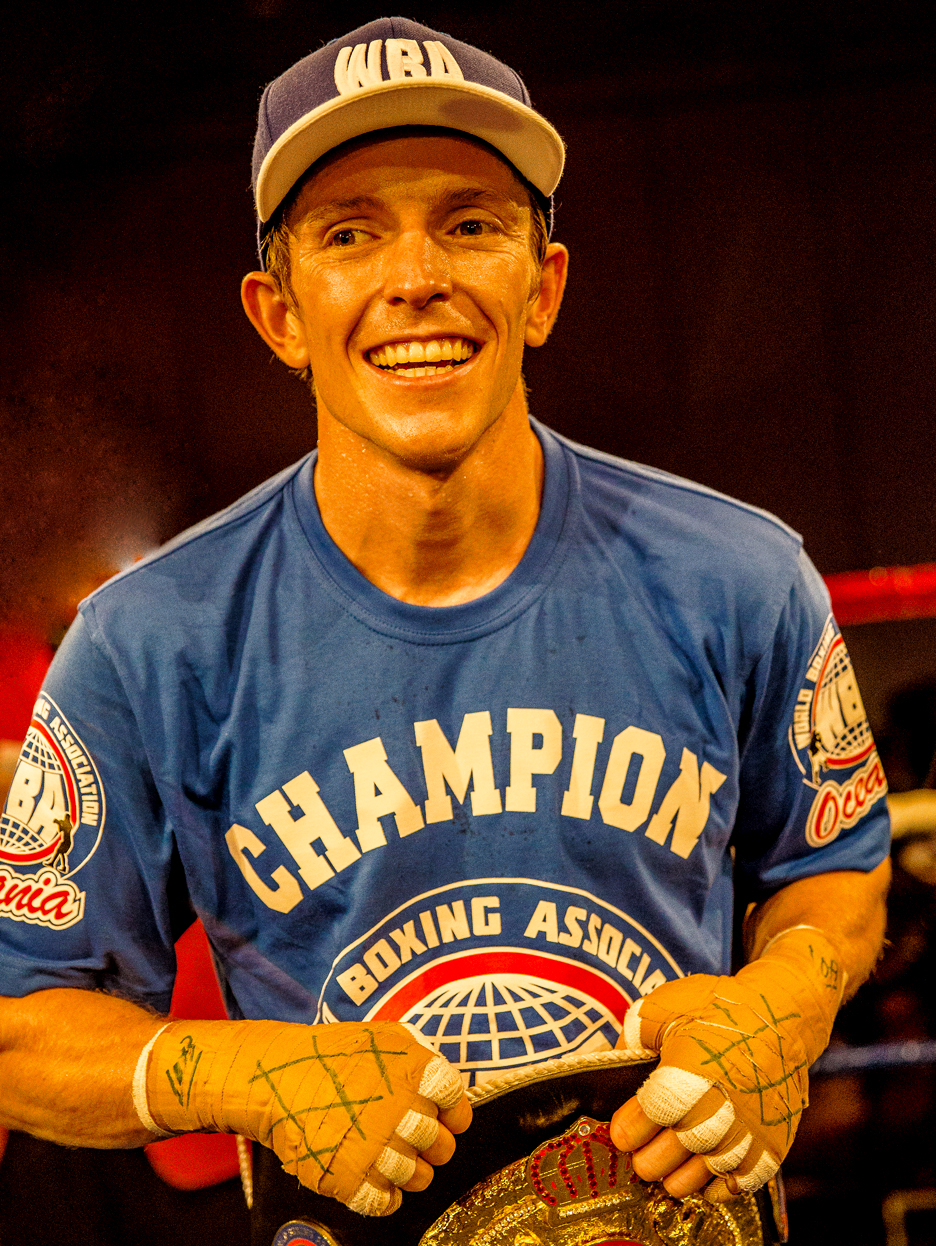

Personal information
- Nickname: "Golden Boy"
- Nationality: Australian
- Born: Qamil Balla; 10 August 1989 (age 37) Werribee, Victoria, Australia
- Height: 1.78 m (5 ft 10 in)
- Weight: Lightweight; Super lightweight

Boxing career
- Reach: 175 cm (69 in)
- Stance: Orthodox

Boxing record
- Total fights: 18
- Wins: 15
- Win by KO: 6
- Losses: 2
- Draws: 1

Qamil Balla (born 10 August 1989) is an Australian professional boxer. OPBF welterweight 9th place. WBO Asia Pacific Welterweight 10th place. As an amateur, he competed at the 2010 Commonwealth Games.

== Family background ==
Qamil Balla was born in Werribee to an Albanian family that immigrated from Albania to Australia prior to his birth. Balla is Muslim. Certain members of his family are boxers. His father Nuri was a Victorian champion while his uncle Mitat (also his former coach) was an Australian champion. His younger brother Ibrahim has also won Australian titles and represented Australia at the 2012 Summer Olympics in the bantamweight division.

Qamil starting boxing as a youngster alongside his brother Ibrahim and, by the age of 12, both were competing in – and winning – junior tournaments.

== Amateur career ==
As an amateur Balla competed in 70 bouts, with 62 wins. He won multiple Victorian and Australian titles, represented Australia internationally and finished top 30 in the world.

Balla was runner up in selection for the 2012 Summer Olympics in the light welterweight division but missed out to former WBO welterweight champion Jeff Horn with Gealan Toulea finishing in third position. Qamil had beaten Horn early in his amateur career in Port Adelaide at the selection trials for the 2009 World Championships but lost in a rematch at the Arafura Games and then in the 64 kg category at the 2012 Olympic trials.

== Professional career ==
=== Victoria State super lightweight champion ===
Qamil won his first professional title on 25 July 2013 against Nawakon Kitee of Thailand at The Melbourne Pavilion Flemington, Qamil being declared the winner by UD.

=== Australian super lightweight champion ===
On 12 September 2013 Qamil won his second professional title in his first 10-round bout against the tough Australian boxer Jack Brubaker at The Melbourne Pavilion Flemington. Qamil won by unanimous points decision with the judges cards reading 96–94, 98–92 and 97–93.

On 25 June 2014 Qamil had his first title defence against fellow Melburnian and former Victorian Lightweight Champion Terry Tzouramanis. Qamil won the fight by unanimous points decision with the judge's cards reading 97–91, 98–90 and 99–89. Tzouramanis went down in round 3 and was deducted 1 pt in round 8 for excessive holding.

=== Interim WBA Oceania lightweight champion ===
Qamil won his third professional title on 18 March 2017 against experienced Colombian Rodolfo Puente. Referee Ignatius Missailidis stopped the fight at 2:29 in the first round following the second knockdown, Qamil declared the winner by TKO.

=== Balla Vs Kambosos ===
On 6 May 2017 Qamil experienced his first professional defeat against George Kambosos Jr. The bout was billed as the semi main event to the Joseph Parker Vs Razvan Cojanu, WBO World Heavyweight Title fight at New Zealand's Vodafone Events Centre, Manukau City.

The two Australians put on the fight of the night with Kambosos taking control early and winning by unanimous points decision.

=== WBA Oceania super lightweight champion ===
On 4 May 2019 Qamil started the year off with a solid TKO victory over experienced Indonesian Hero Tito for the vacant WBA Oceania Super lightweight title. The win was an impressive victory for Qamil after spending 14 months away from the ring due to a knuckle injury.

== Professional boxing record ==
18 fights	15 wins	2 losses
By knockout	8	1
By decision	7	1
Draws	1	

No	Result	Record	Opponent	Type	Round	Date	Location	Notes
18	Loss	15–2–1	(Japan) Jin Sasaki	TKO	7/12	3 Sep 2024	(Japan) Ariake Arena, Tokyo	For WBO Asia Pacific and OPBF welterweight titles
17	Win	15–1–1	(Thailand) Atchariya Wirojanasunobol	TKO	2/10	16 Jun 2023	(Australia) The Melbourne Pavilion, Flemington	
16	Win	14–1–1	(Fiji) Ronald Naidu	RTD	1/6	5 Mar 2022	(Australia) The Melbourne Pavilion, Flemington	
15	Win	13–1–1	(Indonesia) Hero Tito	TKO	6/10	4 May 2019	(Australia) Grand Star Receptions, Altona North	Won vacant WBA Oceania super lightweight title
14	Win	12–1–1	(Philippines) Adam Diu Abdulhamid	UD	10	11 Mar 2018	(Australia) Grand Star Receptions, Altona North	
13	Loss	11–1–1	(Australia) George Kambosos Jr.	UD	10	6 May 2017	(New Zealand) Vodafone Events Centre, Manukau City	
12	Win	11–0–1	(Colombia) Rodolfo Puente	TKO	1/10	18 Mar 2017	(Australia) Function Centre Melbourne Park, Melbourne	Won interim WBA Oceania lightweight title
11	Win	10–0–1	(Indonesia) Musa Letding	KO	5/10	10 Dec 2016	(Australia) Function Centre Melbourne Park, Melbourne	
10	Win	9–0–1	(Thailand) Terdchai Doungmontree	UD	8	13 Aug 2016	(Australia) Function Centre Melbourne Park, Melbourne	
9	Win	8–0–1	(Australia) Ben Warburton	UD	6	11 Nov 2015	(Australia) Convention & Exhibition Centre, Melbourne	
8	Win	7–0–1	(Australia) Terry Tzouramanis	UD	10	25 Jun 2014	(Australia) The Melbourne Pavilion, Flemington	Retained Australian super lightweight title
7	Win	6–0–1	(Australia) Jack Brubaker	UD	10	12 Sep 2013	(Australia) The Melbourne Pavilion, Flemington	Won vacant Australian super lightweight title
6	Win	5–0–1	(Thailand) Nawakon Kitee	UD	8	25 Jul 2013	(Australia) The Melbourne Pavilion, Flemington	Won vacant Australia – Victoria State super lightweight title
5	Win	4–0–1	(Australia) Jay Thompson	TKO	1/6	28 Apr 2013	(Australia) Convention & Exhibition Centre, Melbourne	
4	Win	3–0–1	(Australia) Rangson Poonsang	UD	6	21 Feb 2013	(Australia) The Melbourne Pavilion, Flemington	
3	Win	2–0–1	(Australia) Matt Bune	TKO	2/4	7 Sep 2012	(Australia) The Melbourne Pavilion, Flemington	
2	Win	1–0–1	(Australia) Justin Medoro	TKO	2/4	13 Jul 2012	(Australia) The Melbourne Pavilion, Flemington	
1	Draw	0–0–1	(Philippines) Allan Jay Tuniacao	D	4	18 May 2012	(Australia) The Melbourne Pavilion, Flemington	
