= Jason Moloney =

Australian boxer (born 1991)

Personal information
- Nickname: Mayhem
- Born: 10 January 1991 (age 35) Mitcham, Victoria, Australia
- Height: 5 ft 5 in (165 cm)
- Weight: Bantamweight; Super bantamweight

Boxing career
- Reach: 65 in (165 cm)
- Stance: Orthodox

Boxing record
- Total fights: 34
- Wins: 30
- Win by KO: 20
- Losses: 4

Jason Moloney (born 10 January 1991) is an Australian professional boxer, who held the WBO bantamweight title from May 2023 to May 2024. He previously challenged twice for the IBF bantamweight title. At regional level, he has held the WBA Oceania bantamweight title since 2017 and held the Commonwealth bantamweight title in 2018. As an amateur he represented Australia at the 2010 Commonwealth Games.

== Amateur career ==
=== 2010 Commonwealth Games ===
Moloney competed in the men's flyweight division at the 2010 Commonwealth Games.

Moloney’s first fight of the competition was against Michael Conlan from Ireland. He beat Conlan via a points decision on count-back.

He would then go on to face Oteng Oteng (Botswana) in the men’s quarterfinals, losing via a close points decision.

== Professional career ==
=== Super-bantamweight ===
Following the 2014 national amateur championships, Moloney turned professional in August 2014. Moloney made his professional debut against Chatri Sariphan on 15 August 2014. He won the fight by a first-round technical knockout. Moloney amassed a 5-0 record during the next year, before being scheduled to face Markquil Salvana for the vacant WBA Oceania super bantamweight title on 18 December 2015. Salvana retired from the fight at the end of the fifth round, due to swelling around his right eye. Moloney made his first WBA Oceania title defense against Junior Bajawa on 19 March 2016. He retained the belt by a fourth-round technical knockout.

After capturing his first professional title, Moloney was scheduled to face Matias Agustin Arriagada in a non-title bout on 20 May 2016. He won the fight by a fifth-round technical knockout. Moloney was scheduled to face Virden Rivera in another non-title bout on 24 June 2016. He won the fight by a third-round knockout. Moloney faced Jeffrey Francisco on 3 August 2016, in a yet another non-title bout. He won the fight by unanimous decision, with scores of 59-54, 59-54 and 60-53.

Moloney made his second WBA Oceania super bantamweight title defense against Gerpaul Valero on 8 October 2016, at the Melbourne Park in Melbourne, Australia. He won the fight by a seventh-round technical knockout. He was leading 60-53 on all three of the judges' scorecards at the time of the stoppage. Moloney made his third title defense against Enrique Bernache on 10 December 2016, with the fight once again taking place at the Melbourne Park in Melbourne, Australia. He won the fight by a sixth-round technical knockout. Bernache was deducted a point in the fifth round, due to repeated low blows.

Moloney faced Marco Demecillo in a non-title bout on 3 February 2017, in his first fight of the year. He won the fight by unanimous decision, with scores of 80-69, 80-71 and 80-70. Demecillo was deducted a point in the eight round for a low blow. Moloney made his fourth WBA Oceania title defense against Emanuel Armendariz on 3 June 2017. He won the fight by a fifth-round technical knockout, and was leading 40-36, 40-36 and 39-37 on the scorecards at the time of the stoppage. Moloney the fifth and final defense of his secondary WBA title against Lolito Sonsona on 19 August 2017. Aside from the WBA Oceania title, the vacant OPBF Silver title was likewise on the line. He won the fight by unanimous decision, with scores of 100-90, 99-91 and 100-90.

=== Bantamweight ===
==== WBA Oceania champion ====
After successfully defending the WBA Oceania super bantamweight title for the fifth time, Moloney moved down to bantamweight. Moloney was scheduled to face Julias Kisarawe for the vacant WBA Oceania bantamweight title on 21 October 2017, in his first fight at bantamweight. He won the fight by a first-round stoppage, knocking Kisarawe out with two seconds left in the round. Moloney made his first WBA Oceania bantamweight title defense against the one-time WBO title challenger Immanuel Naidjala on 24 February 2018, with the vacant Commonwealth bantamweight title being on the line as well. He won the fight by a third-round technical knockout, after winning the first two rounds on all three of the judges' scorecards. Moloney made his second WBA Oceania title defense against the former WBA super-flyweight titleholder Kohei Kono on 19 May 2018. He was awarded a stoppage victory after the sixth round, after the ringside doctor determined that a cut to the outside of Kono’s left eye was too severe for him to continue fighting.

==== Moloney vs. Rodríguez ====
Moloney participated in the second season of the World Boxing Super Series, which took place in October 2018 and November 2019, and focused on the bantamweight division. Moloney, at the time the IBF mandatory title challenger, faced the undefeated 18-0 IBF bantamweight champion Emmanuel Rodríguez in the tournament quarterfinals on 20 October 2018, at the Addition Financial Arena in Orlando, Florida. He lost the fight by split decision. Two of the judges scored the fight 115-113 for Rodríguez, while the third judge gave Moloney the identical scorecard. Moloney appeared to take the fight over as it neared the championship rounds, but was unable to overcome the points lead that Rodríguez had accumulated up to that point.

==== Continued WBA Oceania reign ====
Moloney made the third defense of his secondary title against Cris Paulino on 30 March 2019. He won the fight by a fifth-round technical knockout, stopping Paulino at the very last second of the round. Moloney made his fourth WBA Oceania title defense against Goodluck Mrema on 15 June 2019. He won the fight by a third-round knockout, flooring Mrema with a left hook at the 2:23 minute mark. Moloney made his fifth and final WBA Oceania title defense against the one-time WBC super-flyweight title challenger Dixon Flores on 15 November 2019. He won the fight by knockout, stopping Flores midway through the second round. Moloney faced Leonardo Baez in a stay-busy non-title bout on 25 June 2020. Baez retired from the fight at the end of the seventh round.

==== Moloney vs. Inoue ====
Moloney, at the time ranked #6 by The Ring and #1 by the WBO, was scheduled to challenge the reigning WBA (Super), IBF and The Ring bantamweight champion Naoya Inoue on 31 October 2020, at the MGM Grand Conference Center in Paradise, Nevada. Moloney stepped in as a replacement for the WBO bantamweight champion John Riel Casimero, who was forced to withdraw due to the COVID-19 pandemic. Moloney, who entered the bout as a +550 underdog, lost the fight by a late seventh-round knockout. Inoue first knocked Moloney down with a counter left hook in the sixth round, although he was able to recover from it. Moloney was once again knocked down in the seventh round, with a short right hook, and was unable to beat the ten count. He was outlanded by Inoue 107 to 62 in total punches and 63 to 32 in power punches landed. Moloney was losing on all three of the judges' scorecards at the time of the stoppage.

==== Continued bantamweight career ====
Moloney faced Joshua Greer Jr. for the vacant WBC Silver bantamweight title on 14 August 2021, at the Hard Rock Hotel & Casino in Tulsa, Oklahoma. The bout was scheduled for the undercard of the Joshua Franco and Andrew Moloney trilogy match, and was broadcast by ESPN. He won the fight by unanimous decision, with scores of 98-92, 98-92 and 96-94. Moloney called for a world title fight against either the WBC champion Nonito Donaire or John Riel Casimero in his post-fight interview.

Moloney made his first WBC Silver title defense against Aston Palicte on 5 June 2022, on the George Kambosos Jr. vs. Devin Haney undercard. Aside from the WBC Silver title, the vacant WBO International bantamweight title was on the line as well. He won the fight by a third-round knockout. Moloney first knocked Palicte down with a right straight, before finishing the fight with a flurry of punches at the 2:35 minute mark.

=== WBO bantamweight champion ===
==== Moloney vs. Astrolabio ====
On 13 May 2023 at Stockton Arena in Stockton, California, USA, Moloney defeated Vincent Astrolabio by majority decision to win the vacant WBO bantamweight title.

==== Moloney vs. Sanchez ====
On 13 January 2024 at Videotron Centre in Québec City, Quebec, Canada, Moloney successfully defended his WBO bantamweight title by majority decision against Saul Sanchez.

==== Moloney vs. Takei ====
Moloney was scheduled to make the second defense of his WBO bantamweight title against Yoshiki Takei on 6 May 2024 at Tokyo Dome in Tokyo, Japan. Moloney lost the bout via unanimous decision (116-111, 116-111, 117-110).

==== Moloney vs. Nasukawa ====
Moloney faced Tenshin Nasukawa at Ariake Arena in Tokyo, Japan, on 24 February 2025. The fight was part of a high-profile card featuring Junto Nakatani defending his WBC bantamweight title against David Cuellar Nasukawa defeated Moloney by unanimous decision, earning scorecards of 98-92 and 97-93 (twice) from the judges.

==== Moloney vs. Gomez ====
Moloney snapped his two fight losing streak with a fourth round technical knockout win over Herlan Gomez at the Gold Coast Convention and Exhibition Centre in Broadbeach, Australia, on 6 December 2025.

==== Moloney vs. Donovan ====
Moloney defeated Andre Donovan via unanimous decision to win the vacant IBF Inter-Continental bantamweight title at Fortitude Music Hall in Fortitude Valley, Australia, on 23 April 2026.

=== Zuffa Boxing ===
In July 2026, it was announced that Moloney had signed a multi-fight deal with Zuffa Boxing. On his debut for the promotion he beat Andres Teran on a unanimous decision at The Venue, Riyadh, Saudi Arabia, on 14 November 2026.

== Professional boxing record ==
| 34 fights | 30 wins | 4 losses |
|---|---|---|
| By knockout | 20 | 1 |
| By decision | 10 | 3 |

| No. | Result | Record | Opponent | Type | Round, time | Date | Location | Notes |
|---|---|---|---|---|---|---|---|---|
| 34 | Win | 30–4 | Andres Teran | UD | 10 | 14 Nov 2026 | The Venue Riyadh Season, Riyadh, Saudi Arabia | |
| 33 | Win | 29–4 | Andre Donovan | UD | 10 | 23 Apr 2026 | Fortitude Music Hall, Fortitude Valley, Australia | Won vacant IBF Inter-Continental bantamweight title |
| 32 | Win | 28–4 | Herlan Gomez | TKO | 4 (8), 2:45 | 6 Dec 2025 | Gold Coast Convention and Exhibition Centre, Broadbeach, Australia | |
| 31 | Loss | 27–4 | Tenshin Nasukawa | UD | 10 | 24 Feb 2025 | Ariake Arena, Tokyo, Japan | |
| 30 | Loss | 27–3 | Yoshiki Takei | UD | 12 | 6 May 2024 | Tokyo Dome, Tokyo, Japan | Lost WBO bantamweight title |
| 29 | Win | 27–2 | Saul Sanchez | MD | 12 | 13 Jan 2024 | Videotron Centre, Quebec City, Canada | Retained WBO bantamweight title |
| 28 | Win | 26–2 | Vincent Astrolabio | MD | 12 | 13 May 2023 | Stockton Arena, Stockton, California, US | Won vacant WBO bantamweight title |
| 27 | Win | 25–2 | Nawaphon Kaikanha | UD | 12 | 16 Oct 2022 | Rod Laver Arena, Melbourne, Australia | |
| 26 | Win | 24–2 | Aston Palicte | TKO | 3 (10), 2:35 | 5 Jun 2022 | Marvel Stadium, Melbourne, Australia | Retained WBC Silver bantamweight title; Won vacant WBO International bantamweight title |
| 25 | Win | 23–2 | Francisco Pedroza Portillo | UD | 10 | 9 Apr 2022 | The Hangar, Costa Mesa, California, US | |
| 24 | Win | 22–2 | Joshua Greer Jr. | UD | 10 | 14 Aug 2021 | Hard Rock Hotel & Casino, Tulsa, Oklahoma, US | Won vacant WBC Silver bantamweight title |
| 23 | Loss | 21–2 | Naoya Inoue | KO | 7 (12), 2:59 | 31 Oct 2020 | MGM Grand Conference Center, Paradise, Nevada, US | For WBA (Super), IBF, and The Ring bantamweight titles |
| 22 | Win | 21–1 | Leonardo Baez | RTD | 7 (10), 3:00 | 25 Jun 2020 | MGM Grand Conference Center, Paradise, Nevada, US | |
| 21 | Win | 20–1 | Dixon Flores | KO | 2 (10), 1:26 | 15 Nov 2019 | Margaret Court Arena, Melbourne, Australia | |
| 20 | Win | 19–1 | Goodluck Mrema | KO | 3 (10), 2:23 | 15 Jun 2019 | Seagulls Rugby League Club, Tweed Heads, Australia | |
| 19 | Win | 18–1 | Cris Paulino | TKO | 5 (10), 2:59 | 30 Mar 2019 | Seagulls Rugby League Club, Tweed Heads, Australia | |
| 18 | Loss | 17–1 | Emmanuel Rodríguez | SD | 12 | 20 Oct 2018 | CFE Arena, Orlando, Florida, US | For IBF bantamweight title; World Boxing Super Series: bantamweight quarter-final |
| 17 | Win | 17–0 | Kohei Kono | RTD | 6 (12), 3:00 | 19 May 2018 | Malvern Town Hall, Melbourne, Australia | |
| 16 | Win | 16–0 | Immanuel Naidjala | TKO | 3 (12), 1:14 | 24 Feb 2018 | St Kilda Town Hall, Melbourne, Australia | Won vacant Commonwealth bantamweight title |
| 15 | Win | 15–0 | Julias Kisarawe | KO | 1 (10), 2:58 | 21 Oct 2017 | Melbourne Park, Melbourne, Australia | |
| 14 | Win | 14–0 | Lolito Sonsona | UD | 10 | 19 Aug 2017 | Melbourne Park, Melbourne, Australia | Won vacant OPBF Silver super-bantamweight title |
| 13 | Win | 13–0 | Emanuel Armendariz | TKO | 5 (10), 0:53 | 3 Jun 2017 | Melbourne Park, Melbourne, Australia | |
| 12 | Win | 12–0 | Marco Demecillo | UD | 8 | 3 Feb 2017 | Adelaide Oval, Adelaide, Australia | |
| 11 | Win | 11–0 | Enrique Bernache | TKO | 6 (10), 0:21 | 10 Dec 2016 | Melbourne Park, Melbourne, Australia | |
| 10 | Win | 10–0 | Gerpaul Valero | TKO | 7 (10), 2:05 | 8 Oct 2016 | Melbourne Park, Melbourne, Australia | |
| 9 | Win | 9–0 | Jeffrey Francisco | UD | 6 | 3 Aug 2016 | Hisense Arena, Melbourne, Australia | |
| 8 | Win | 8–0 | Virden Rivera | KO | 3 (10) | 24 Jun 2016 | Malvern Town Hall, Melbourne, Australia | |
| 7 | Win | 7–0 | Matias Agustin Arriagada | TKO | 5 (8), 2:55 | 20 May 2016 | Melbourne Pavilion, Melbourne, Australia | |
| 6 | Win | 6–0 | Junior Bajawa | TKO | 4 (10), 1:18 | 19 Mar 2016 | Malvern Town Hall, Melbourne, Australia | |
| 5 | Win | 5–0 | Markquil Salvana | RTD | 5 (10), 3:00 | 18 Dec 2015 | Malvern Town Hall, Melbourne, Australia | |
| 4 | Win | 4–0 | Danilo Gabisay | TKO | 5 (6), 2:14 | 19 Aug 2015 | Hisense Arena, Melbourne, Australia | |
| 3 | Win | 3–0 | Alvin Bais | TKO | 3 (6), 1:17 | 6 Mar 2015 | Royal Exhibition Building, Melbourne, Australia | |
| 2 | Win | 2–0 | Egi Rozten | TKO | 1 (6), 1:58 | 17 Oct 2014 | La Mirage Reception & Convention Centre, Melbourne, Australia | |
| 1 | Win | 1–0 | Chatri Sariphan | TKO | 1 (6), 2:50 | 15 Aug 2014 | Melbourne Pavilion, Melbourne, Australia | |

== Personal life ==
Jason is a twin brother to Andrew Moloney, who is also a professional boxer.

== See also ==
- Notable boxing families
- List of world bantamweight boxing champions

Sporting positions
Regional boxing titles
| New title | OBPF Silver super-bantamweight champion 19 August 2017 – 2018; Vacated | Vacant Title next held by Gakuya Furuhashi |
| Vacant Title last held by Duke Micah | Commonwealth bantamweight title 24 February 2018 – 2018; Vacated | Vacant Title next held by Lee McGregor |
| Vacant Title last held by Luis Nery | WBC Silver bantamweight title 14 August 2021 – 13 May 2023; Won world title | Vacant Title next held by Juan Martinez Ayala |
| Vacant Title last held by Paul Butler | WBO International bantamweight champion 5 June 2022 – 13 May 2023; Won world title | Vacant |
World boxing titles
| Vacant Title last held by Naoya Inoue | WBO bantamweight champion 13 May 2023 – 6 May 2024 | Succeeded by Yoshiki Takei |
