= George Kambosos Jr. vs. Devin Haney =

Boxing match

Undisputed
- Date: 5 June 2022
- Venue: Docklands Stadium, Melbourne, Victoria, Australia
- Title(s) on the line: WBA (Super), WBC, IBF, WBO and The Ring undisputed lightweight titles

Tale of the tape
Boxer	George Kambosos Jr.	Devin Haney
Nickname	Ferocious	The Dream
Hometown	Sydney, New South Wales, Australia	San Francisco, California, U.S.
Pre-fight record	20–0 (10 KO)	27–0 (15 KO)
Age	28 years, 11 months	23 years, 6 months
Height	5 ft 8 1/2 in (174 cm)	5 ft 8 in (173 cm)
Weight	134.49 lb (61 kg)	134.92 lb (61 kg)
Style	Orthodox	Orthodox
Recognition	WBA (Super), IBF, WBO and The Ring; Lightweight Champion	WBC; Lightweight Champion; The Ring; No. 3 Ranked Lightweight

Result
- Haney wins via 12-round unanimous decision (116-112, 116-112, 118-110)

George Kambosos Jr. vs. Devin Haney, billed as Undisputed, was a professional boxing match contested on 5 June 2022, for the undisputed lightweight championship.

Haney defeated Kambosos via unanimous decision to become the first undisputed lightweight champion since Pernell Whitaker in 1990, and the first in the four-belt era.

== Background ==
After defeating Vasiliy Lomachenko in October 2020, Teófimo López claimed to have become the undisputed champion in the lightweight division. However, many boxing purists rejected López's claim, believing Devin Haney had the legitimate WBC lightweight title, meaning that there was still not an undisputed lightweight champion. Haney called out López for a bout to end the debate, which did not materialise. Haney was set to be ordered to face fellow American lightweight Ryan Garcia, which Garcia dismissed, instead advocating for a bout with Gervonta Davis. Haney then agreed to a title defence against Jorge Linares, winning by unanimous decision.

Meanwhile, López was forced to a mandatory defence against Australian George Kambosos Jr, which was originally set for 5 June in Miami, Florida, before being moved to 19 June. López then tested positive for COVID-19, and after multiple setbacks, the fight was finally set for 27 November in New York City, New York. In one of the biggest upsets of 2021, Kambosos Jr defeated López via split decision, winning the unified lightweight titles in the process.

On 15 October, Ryan Garcia was forced to pull out of his bout with Joseph Diaz, and Devin Haney agreed to step in and face Diaz on 5 December in Las Vegas, Nevada, with Haney winning by unanimous decision. Haney then called out Kambosos Jr, who had defeated López the week before, to determine an undisputed lightweight champion. However, there was another man in the lightweight division looking for Kambosos Jr's titles: Vasiliy Lomachenko, who defeated Richard Commey on 11 December in New York. A potential bout with Lomachenko seemed more likely for Kambosos Jr, as a two-fight deal was agreed without any problems on 15 February 2022. However, on 24 February, Russia invaded Lomachenko's country of Ukraine, with Lomachenko heading over to Ukraine in order to defend his country, as well as unified heavyweight champion and fellow Ukrainian, Oleksandr Usyk. On 20 March, Lomachenko was given permission to leave Ukraine in order to start training for a potential bout with Kambosos Jr. However, Lomachenko declined, opting to stay and fight for his country. This resulted in Kambosos Jr–Haney talks advancing, and on 27 March, the pair struck a deal, which included Haney signing a two-fight deal with Top Rank and Lou DiBella to fight exclusively on ESPN platforms. The deal includes a rematch clause if Haney wins, with the rematch also taking place in Australia. Even if Haney lost, his next bout afterward would be co-promoted by Top Rank and DiBella.

== Fight Details ==
Haney defeated Kambosos via unanimous decision to become the undisputed lightweight champion.

== Aftermath ==
Kambosos activated the rematch clause to take place on 16 October, at Rod Laver Arena also in Melbourne.

== Fight card ==
Confirmed bouts:

Weight Class		vs		Method	Round	Time	Notes
Lightweight	(United States) Devin Haney (c)	def.	(Australia) George Kambosos Jr. (c)	UD	12		^{Note 1}
Bantamweight	(Australia) Jason Moloney	def.	(Philippines) Aston Palicte	TKO	3 (10)	2:35	^{Note 2}
Heavyweight	(Australia) Lucas Browne	def.	(New Zealand) Junior Fa	TKO	1 (10)	1:58	^{Note 3}
Heavyweight	(New Zealand) Hemi Ahio	def.	(Australia) Christian Ndzie Tsoye	RTD	1 (8)
Cruiserweight	(New Zealand) David Nyika	def.	(Australia) Karim Maatalla	UD	5
Super flyweight	(Australia) Andrew Moloney	def.	(Nicaragua) Alexander Espinoza	RTD	2 (8)	3:00
Junior Middleweight	(United States) Amari Jones	def.	(Australia) Ankush Hooda	TKO	2 (6)
Junior Middleweight	(Australia) Terry Nickolas	vs	(Australia) Lachlan Higgins	MD	6
Junior Middleweight	(Australia) Isaias Sette	vs	(Australia) Luke Gersbeck	MD	4
Junior Lightweight	(Australia) Pom Thanawut Phetkum	def.	(Australia) Hussein Fayad	UD	4
Super flyweight	(Australia) Taylah Robertson	def.	(Australia) Sarah Higginson	UD	5
Welterweight	(Italy) Yoel Angeloni	def.	(Australia) Ken Aitken	UD	4

^Note 1 For WBA (Super), WBC, IBF, WBO, and The Ring lightweight titles
^Note 2 For WBC Silver bantamweight, WBO International bantamweight title
^Note 3 For WBA Oceania heavyweight title

== Broadcasting ==
Country	Broadcaster
Australia	Foxtel PPV
United Kingdom	Sky Sports
United States	ESPN+

== See also ==
- Boxing in Australia

Preceded by vs. Teófimo López	George Kambosos Jr.'s bouts 5 June 2022	Succeeded by Rematch
Preceded by vs. Joseph Diaz	Devin Haney's bouts 5 June 2022	Succeeded by Rematch
