= Jin Sasaki =

Japanese professional boxer (born 2001)

Personal information
- Born: 佐々木尽; 28 July 2001 (age 25) Hachiōji, Tokyo, Japan
- Height: 5 ft 8 1/2 in (174 cm)
- Weight: Lightweight; Super-lightweight; Welterweight

Boxing career
- Reach: 69 1/4 in (176 cm)
- Stance: Orthodox

Boxing record
- Total fights: 25
- Wins: 22
- Win by KO: 19
- Losses: 2
- Draws: 1

Jin Sasaki (佐々木尽, Sasaki Jin, born 28 July 2001) is a Japanese professional boxer. He challenged for the WBO welterweight title in 2025. Sasaki has held the Oriental and Pacific Boxing Federation welterweight title since May 2026 and the WBO Asia Pacific and Japanese titles in the same weight division since September 2026. He is also a former WBO Asia Pacific super-lightweight champion.

== Amateur career ==
He started boxing in his first year of junior high school and entered Hachioji Nakaya Gym, where he practiced two or three times a week, but after entering Hachioji Takuma High School, he devoted himself to boxing. Sasaki went 1-3 as an amateur boxer.

== Professional career ==
Sasaki had his professional debut fight against Tsuyoshi Kato at Korakuen Hall in Tokyo on 24 August 2018, and won by technical knockout in the second round.

Sasaki advanced to the 2019 East Japan Lightweight Rookie of the Year final, but abstained from the East Japan Lightweight Rookie of the Year final due to being unable to make weight.

On December 26, 2020, at "Kakeru Holdings presents A-SIGN.BOXING" held at the Sumida Ward General Gymnasium, he fought Aso Ishiwaki for the Japan Super Lightweight Youth Championship, and won by technical knockout in the third round in 2 minutes and 50 seconds.

On 17 July 2021, he defended his title against Kaiki Yuba, the Japanese lightweight youth champion, at the Fujimori Gymnasium in Hachioji City, and won by knockout in the second round in two minutes and three seconds, successfully retaining the belt for the first time. With this win, he qualified for the Japanese super-lightweight championship.

On 19 October 2021, the Japanese and WBO Asia Pacific super-lightweight championship match was held at Korakuen Hall, where he fought Andy Hiraoka, who was ranked 1st in Japan and 2nd in the WBO Asia-Pacific class. Sasaki was stopped in the 11th round in one minute 58 seconds. At the weigh-in the day before, Sasaki was overweight by four pounds and was disqualified from winning the title.

On 25 October 2021, the Japan Boxing Commission (JBC) suspended Sasaki's license for six months after he missed weight for the second time, and collected 20 percent of the fight purse as a fine.

On 9 July 2022, at Esforta Arena Hachioji, Sasaki fought Kotaro Sekine. The fight ended in a draw, where both fighters were knocked down.

On 14 January 2023, Sasaki fought for the vacant WBO Asia-Pacific welterweight title at Korakuen Hall, defeating champion Ryota Toyoshima by technical knockout in the first round in one minute and 56 seconds.

Sasaki won by unanimous decision against Shoki Sakai at Ariake Arena in Tokyo, on 24 January 2025.

Sasaki challenged WBO welterweight champion Brian Norman Jr. at Ota City General Gymnasium in Tokyo on 19 June 2025. He lost by knockout in the fifth round.

He challenged Oriental and Pacific Boxing Federation welterweight champion Sora Tanaka at the Tokyo Dome on 2 May 2026, winning via split decision.

On 21 September 2026, Sasaki knocked out David Ssemujju in the sixth of their scheduled 10 round contest at Tokyo Tama Mirai Messe in Hachiōji to retain the OBPF title and add the WBO Asia Pacific and Japanese welterweight championships to his collection.

== Professional boxing record ==
| 25 fights | 22 wins | 2 losses |
|---|---|---|
| By knockout | 19 | 2 |
| By decision | 3 | 0 |
| Draws | 1 | |

| No. | Result | Record | Opponent | Type | Round, time | Date | Location | Notes |
|---|---|---|---|---|---|---|---|---|
| 25 | Win | 22–2–1 | David Ssemujju | KO | 6 (10), 0:58 | 21 Sep 2026 | Tokyo Tama Mirai Messe, Hachioji, Japan | Retained OPBF welterweight title; Won WBO Asia Pacific and Japanese welterweight titles |
| 24 | Win | 21–2–1 | Sora Tanaka | SD | 10 | 2 May 2026 | Tokyo Dome, Tokyo, Japan | Won OPBF welterweight title |
| 23 | Win | 20–2–1 | Marlon Pagalpalan | TKO | 2 (8), 1:21 | 19 Feb 2026 | Korakuen Hall, Tokyo, Japan | |
| 22 | Loss | 19–2–1 | Brian Norman Jr. | KO | 5 (12), 0:46 | 19 Jun 2025 | Ota City General Gymnasium, Tokyo, Japan | For WBO welterweight title |
| 21 | Win | 19–1–1 | Shoki Sakai | UD | 12 | 24 Jan 2025 | Ariake Arena, Tokyo, Japan | Retained WBO Asia Pacific and OPBF welterweight titles |
| 20 | Win | 18–1–1 | Qamil Balla | TKO | 7 (12), 0:52 | 3 Sep 2024 | Ariake Arena, Tokyo, Japan | Retained WBO Asia Pacific and OPBF welterweight titles |
| 19 | Win | 17–1–1 | Joe Noynay | TKO | 5 (12), 0:43 | 16 May 2024 | Korakuen Hall, Tokyo, Japan | Retained WBO Asia Pacific welterweight title; Won vacant OPBF welterweight title |
| 18 | Win | 16–1–1 | Hiroto Hoshi | TKO | 11 (12), 1:44 | 8 Jul 2023 | Ésforta Arena Hachiōji, Hachioji, Japan | Retained WBO Asia Pacific welterweight title |
| 17 | Win | 15–1–1 | Keita Obara | TKO | 3 (12), 1:13 | 8 Apr 2023 | Ariake Arena, Tokyo, Japan | Retained WBO Asia Pacific welterweight title |
| 16 | Win | 14–1–1 | Ryota Toyoshima | TKO | 1 (12), 1:56 | 14 Jan 2023 | Korakuen Hall, Tokyo, Japan | Won vacant WBO Asia Pacific welterweight title |
| 15 | Win | 13–1–1 | Phatiphan Krungklang | TKO | 3 (8), 2:31 | 15 Nov 2022 | Korakuen Hall, Tokyo, Japan | |
| 14 | Draw | 12–1–1 | Kotaro Sekine | MD | 6 | 9 Jul 2022 | Ésforta Arena Hachiōji, Hachioji, Japan | |
| 13 | Win | 12–1 | Marcus Smith | TKO | 5 (8), 2:49 | 22 Apr 2022 | Korakuen Hall, Tokyo, Japan | |
| 12 | Loss | 11–1 | Andy Hiraoka | TKO | 11 (12), 1:58 | 19 Oct 2021 | Korakuen Hall, Tokyo, Japan | For vacant Japanese and vacant WBO Asia Pacific super lightweight titles |
| 11 | Win | 11–0 | Kaiki Yuba | KO | 2 (8), 2:03 | 17 Jul 2021 | Fujimori Gym, Hachioji, Japan | Retained Japanese Youth super lightweight title |
| 10 | Win | 10–0 | Aso Ishiwaki | TKO | 3 (8), 2:50 | 26 Dec 2020 | Sumida City Gymnasium, Tokyo, Japan | Won vacant Japanese Youth super lightweight title |
| 9 | Win | 9–0 | Tatsuya Miyazaki | TKO | 1 (6), 2:53 | 23 Nov 2020 | Shinjuku FACE, Tokyo, Japan | |
| 8 | Win | 8–0 | Shun Akaiwa | KO | 1 (6), 0:45 | 31 Aug 2020 | Shinjuku FACE, Tokyo, Japan | |
| 7 | Win | 7–0 | Tetsuya Kondo | TKO | 1 (4), 2:36 | 26 Sep 2019 | Korakuen Hall, Tokyo, Japan | |
| 6 | Win | 6–0 | Hikaru Sato | UD | 4 | 6 Aug 2019 | Korakuen Hall, Tokyo, Japan | |
| 5 | Win | 5–0 | Vageta Ishikawa | TKO | 3 (4), 1:36 | 11 Jun 2019 | Korakuen Hall, Tokyo, Japan | |
| 4 | Win | 4–0 | Sirisak Pimpasitta | KO | 2 (4), 0:56 | 21 Apr 2019 | Meenayothin Camp, Bangkok, Thailand | |
| 3 | Win | 3–0 | Naoyuki Tsumoto | TKO | 1 (4), 2:02 | 8 Feb 2019 | Korakuen Hall, Tokyo, Japan | |
| 2 | Win | 2–0 | Ryo Kasai | KO | 3 (4), 0:33 | 7 Nov 2018 | Korakuen Hall, Tokyo, Japan | |
| 1 | Win | 1–0 | Tsuyoshi Kato | TKO | 2 (4), 1:55 | 24 Aug 2018 | Korakuen Hall, Tokyo, Japan | |
