= George Kambosos Jr. =

Australian-Greek boxer (born 1993)

Personal information
- Nicknames: Ferocious; The Emperor
- Born: 14 June 1993 (age 33) Sydney, Australia
- Height: 1.75 m (5 ft 9 in)
- Weight: Lightweight; Light welterweight

Boxing career
- Reach: 173 cm (68 in)
- Stance: Orthodox

Boxing record
- Total fights: 26
- Wins: 22
- Win by KO: 10
- Losses: 4
Medal record
Men's amateur boxing
Arafura Games
Bronze medal – third place	2011 Darwin	Lightweight
Australian National Championships
Silver medal – second place	2009 Canberra	Featherweight
Silver medal – second place	2011 Melbourne	Lightweight
Bronze medal – third place	2012 Hobart	Lightweight

George Kambosos Jr. (born 14 June 1993) is a Greek-Australian professional boxer. He held the unified (Note: World Boxing Association (WBA) (Super version), International Boxing Federation (IBF), and World Boxing Organization (WBO) titles.) lightweight championship from 2021 to 2022, as well as the Ring magazine title during that time. He held the IBO lightweight title from 2022 to 2023.

== Early life ==
Kambosos was born in Sydney, Australia to parents of Greek descent. His paternal grandparents moved from Sparta, Laconia, to Australia and Kambosos has the famous Spartan war cry "Never retreat, never surrender" tattooed on his body in homage to his heritage. He began playing junior rugby league for the Gymea Gorillas at a young age, and was often bullied as a child for being overweight, so his father enrolled him in boxing classes at 11 years of age to improve his fitness. Kambosos quickly dropped the excess weight and was placed in the Cronulla Sharks development squad where he was coached by Ricky Stuart but found himself at a crossroad as a teenager when he was forced to choose between boxing and rugby league. He elected to pursue the boxing pathway and began his fighting career by amassing 85 wins in 100 amateur fights before turning professional. Kambosos attended Bexley Public School in the southern suburbs of Sydney throughout his upbringing.

== Professional career ==
=== Early career ===
Kambosos made his professional boxing debut in May 2013, aged 19, when he faced Filipino fighter Jayson Mac Gura and was victorious via a second-round technical knockout. In December 2016, he captured the WBA Oceania title by beating world number nine Brandon Ogilvie. He then went on to face Qamil Balla in May 2017, whom he defeated by unanimous decision in a ten-round fight. Five months later, he knocked out Krai Setthaphon in the ninth round and won the WBA Oceania and IBF Pan Pacific titles in the lightweight division.

==== Pacquiao's sparring partner ====
In June 2017, Kambosos was tabbed by Manny Pacquiao as his main sparring partner in preparation for the fight with Jeff Horn and has remained Pacquiao's main sparring partner for his fights after Horn as well. In April 2018, Kambosos signed a promotional contract with DiBella Entertainment.

In May 2018, he made his debut in the US and knocked out Jose Forero in just 1 minute and 48 seconds. On 19 January 2019, Kambosos defeated Rey Perez at The MGM Grand in Las Vegas on the undercard of Manny Pacquiao vs Adrien Broner via unanimous decision in his second fight on US soil. On 7 June in Athens, Kambosos returned to his native land of Greece and knocked out Venezuelan 11–2 (9 KOs) Richard Pena in round six in front of the packed out Galatsi Olympic Hall. He called out former two division world champion José Pedraza after his victory.

=== Rise up the ranks ===
==== Kambosos vs Bey ====
On 14 December 2019, Kambosos faced his toughest opponent yet, former IBF lightweight champion Mickey Bey. He won the bout by split decision on the undercard of Terence Crawford vs Egidijus Kavaliauskas. Scorecards read 97–92, 96–93 and 94–95 in favour of Kambosos.

==== Kambosos vs Selby ====
On 31 October 2020, Kambosos defeated former IBF featherweight champion Lee Selby by split decision at The SSE Arena in London. Selby was ranked #1 by the WBO, #4 by the IBF and #12 by the WBC at the time. The win over Selby made Kambosos the mandatory challenger for the IBF lightweight title.

=== Unified lightweight champion ===
==== Kambosos vs López ====
On 9 January 2021, the IBF ordered undefeated unified lightweight champion Teofimo Lopez to defend his titles against Kambosos, their number one contender and mandatory challenger. The fight was initially set for 5 June 2021 at the LoanDepot Park in Miami, Florida, before being postponed multiple times, due to complications involving López contracting COVID-19, and disputes over the venue of the fight. The fight had gone to purse bids which was won by Triller with a winning bid of over US $6 million. However, on 6 October, it transpired that the IBF had found Triller in default of its contract obligation to stage the fight, and that its rights would be awarded to the second highest bidder, Eddie Hearn's Matchroom, and the fight was shown live exclusively on the streaming service DAZN. Both fighters each traded a knock down but ultimately Kambosos won the bout via split decision to become the new unified lightweight world champion. One judge had it 114–113 for López, while the other two judges scored the bout 115–112 and 115–111 in favour of Kambosos.

==== Kambosos vs Haney ====
On 5 June 2022, Kambosos Jr. and Devin Haney clashed at Marvel Stadium in Melbourne, Australia to determine the 1st undisputed lightweight champion of the four-belt era. The fight did not proceed without controversy, as Kambosos was unable to make weight on his first attempt. He initially weighed in at 135.36 lbs, 0.36 lbs over the 135 lb limit for the lightweight division. On his second attempt an hour later, within the two-hour limit, Kambosos weighed in at 134.49 lbs. The fight then proceeded as planned and Kambosos was defeated by Haney after a unanimous decision, with two judges scoring the fight 116–112 and one judge scoring it 118–110, all in favor of Haney. The deal for the fight included an automatic rematch clause which Kambosos exercised. The rematch occurred on October 16, 2022, in Australia.

==== Kambosos vs Haney II ====
George Kambosos and Devin Haney met in their rematch at Rod Laver Arena in Melbourne, Australia on October 16, 2022. Kambosos lost the fight via unanimous decision with the scores of 118–110 (twice) and 119–109, in favor of Haney.

==== Lomachenko vs. Kambosos ====
On May 12, 2024, in Perth, Western Australia, Kambosos fought Vasiliy Lomachenko for the vacant IBF lightweight title. Lomachenko defeated Kambosos by TKO in the 11th round by bodyshot. This was after Kambosos went down to a bodyshot earlier in the round and took a standing eight count. Kambosos' corner threw in the towel after the second knockdown before the referee waved off the fight.

==== Kambosos vs. Wyllie ====
Kambosos was scheduled to face Daud Yordan at the Qudos Bank Arena in the Sydney Olympic Park on March 22, 2025. At the beginning of the fight week it was announced that Yordan withdrew due to medical reasons, and was replaced by Jake Wyllie.

== Professional boxing record ==
26 fights	22 wins	4 losses
By knockout	10	2
By decision	12	2

No.	Result	Record	Opponent	Type	Round, time	Date	Location	Notes
26	Loss	22–4	Richardson Hitchins	KO	8 (12), 2:32	14 Jun 2025	The Theater at Madison Square Garden, New York City, New York, US	For IBF light welterweight title
25	Win	22–3	Jake Wyllie	UD	12	22 Mar 2025	Qudos Bank Arena, Sydney, Australia	
24	Loss	21–3	Vasiliy Lomachenko	TKO	11 (12), 2:49	12 May 2024	RAC Arena, Perth, Australia	Lost IBO lightweight title; For vacant IBF lightweight title
23	Win	21–2	Maxi Hughes	MD	12	22 Jul 2023	Firelake Arena, Shawnee, Oklahoma, US	Won IBO lightweight title
22	Loss	20–2	Devin Haney	UD	12	16 Oct 2022	Rod Laver Arena, Melbourne, Australia	For WBA (Super), WBC, IBF, WBO, and The Ring lightweight titles
21	Loss	20–1	Devin Haney	UD	12	5 Jun 2022	Docklands Stadium, Melbourne, Australia	Lost WBA (Super), IBF, WBO, and The Ring lightweight titles; For WBC lightweight title
20	Win	20–0	Teofimo Lopez	SD	12	27 Nov 2021	Hulu Theater at Madison Square Garden, New York City, New York, US	Won WBA (Super), IBF, WBO, and The Ring lightweight titles
19	Win	19–0	Lee Selby	SD	12	31 Oct 2020	The SSE Arena, London, England	
18	Win	18–0	Mickey Bey	SD	10	14 Dec 2019	Madison Square Garden, New York City, New York, US	
17	Win	17–0	Richard Pena	TKO	6 (10), 1:36	7 Jun 2019	Galatsi Olympic Hall, Athens, Greece	
16	Win	16–0	Rey Perez	UD	8	19 Jan 2019	MGM Grand Garden Arena, Paradise, Nevada, US	
15	Win	15–0	JR Magboo	TKO	2 (8), 2:02	15 Jul 2018	Axiata Arena, Kuala Lumpur, Malaysia	
14	Win	14–0	Jose Forero	KO	1 (10), 1:48	5 May 2018	Foxwoods Resort Casino, Ledyard, Connecticut, US	
13	Win	13–0	Kaewfah Tor Buamas	TKO	9 (10), 1:59	13 Oct 2017	Melbourne Pavilion, Melbourne, Australia	Retained WBA Oceania lightweight title; Won vacant IBF Pan Pacific lightweight title
12	Win	12–0	Qamil Balla	UD	10	6 May 2017	Vodafone Events Centre, Auckland, New Zealand	
11	Win	11–0	Brandon Ogilvie	UD	12	2 Dec 2016	Luna Park, Sydney, Australia	Won WBA Oceania lightweight title
10	Win	10–0	Issa Nampepeche	RTD	4 (12), 3:00	8 Jun 2016	Entertainment Centre, Sydney, Australia	Retained WBA-PABA lightweight title
9	Win	9–0	Joebert Delos Reyes	KO	4 (12), 2:34	12 Dec 2015	Alexandria Basketball Stadium, Sydney, Australia	Retained WBA-PABA lightweight title
8	Win	8–0	Leonardo Esteban Gonzalez	TKO	3 (12), 2:59	4 Jul 2015	Club Punchbowl, Sydney, Australia	Won WBA-PABA interim lightweight title
7	Win	7–0	Rodynie Rafol	UD	6	31 Jan 2015	Allphones Arena, Sydney, Australia	
6	Win	6–0	Robert Toomey	UD	10	29 Aug 2014	Club Punchbowl, Sydney, Australia	Won Australian lightweight title
5	Win	5–0	Akrapong Nakthaem	TKO	1 (6), 2:30	9 Apr 2014	Entertainment Centre, Newcastle, Australia	
4	Win	4–0	Paitoon Jaikom	UD	6	29 Jan 2014	Entertainment Centre, Brisbane, Australia	
3	Win	3–0	Michael Correa	TKO	6 (8), 2:59	22 Nov 2013	Croatian Club, Sydney, Australia	Won vacant NSW state lightweight title
2	Win	2–0	Roberto Oyan	UD	6	17 Aug 2013	Croatian Club, Sydney, Australia	
1	Win	1–0	Jayson Mac Gura	TKO	2 (6), 2:06	18 May 2013	Croatian Club, Sydney, Australia	

== Titles in boxing ==
=== Major world titles ===
- WBA (Super) lightweight champion (135 lbs)
- IBF lightweight champion (135 lbs)
- WBO lightweight champion (135 lbs)

=== The Ring magazine titles ===
- The Ring lightweight champion (135 lbs)

=== Minor world titles ===
- IBO lightweight champion (135 lbs)

=== Regional/International titles ===
- WBA Oceania lightweight champion (135 lbs)
- IBF Pan Pacific lightweight champion (135 lbs)
- Australian lightweight champion (135 lbs)
- New South Wales lightweight champion (135 lbs)
- PABA interim lightweight champion (135 lbs)

=== Honorary titles ===
- WBC Franchise lightweight champion

== See also ==
- List of world lightweight boxing champions

== Notes ==
Sporting positions
Regional boxing titles
Vacant Title last held by Valentine Borg	New South Wales lightweight champion 22 November 2013 – 2014	Vacant Title next held by Nathan Wright
Preceded by Robert Toomey	Australian lightweight champion 29 August 2014 – 2015	Vacant Title next held by Miles Zalewski
Vacant Title last held by Azad Azizov	PABA lightweight champion Interim title 4 July 2015 – August 2015; Promoted to full champion	Vacant Title next held by Will Tomlinson
Vacant Title last held by Roman Andreev	PABA lightweight champion August 2015 – March 2016	Vacant Title next held by Liquan Lin
Preceded by Brandon Ogilivie	WBA Oceania lightweight champion March 2016 – November 2017	Vacant Title next held by Kye MacKenzie
Vacant Title last held by Tosho Makoto Aoki	IBF Pan Pacific lightweight champion 13 October 2017 – 27 November 2021; Won world title	Vacant Title next held by Phumiritdet; Chonlathondamrongkun
Minor world boxing titles
Preceded by Maxi Hughes	IBO lightweight champion 22 July 2023 – 12 May 2024; Vacant after loss to Lomachenko	Vacant
Major world boxing titles
Preceded by Teófimo López	WBA lightweight champion Super title 27 November 2021 – 5 June 2022	Succeeded by Devin Haney
Preceded by Teófimo López	IBF lightweight champion 27 November 2021 – 5 June 2022	Succeeded by Devin Haney
Preceded by Teófimo López	WBO lightweight champion 27 November 2021 – 5 June 2022	Succeeded by Devin Haney
Preceded by Teófimo López	The Ring lightweight champion 27 November 2021 – 5 June 2022	Succeeded by Devin Haney
