= Norbelto Jimenez =

Dominican boxer

Personal information
- Nickname: Meneito
- Nationality: Dominican
- Born: Norbelto Irenes Jiménez Lorenzo; 26 February 1991 (age 35) Santo Domingo, Dominican Republic
- Height: 5 ft 6 in (168 cm)
- Weight: Super-flyweight; Bantamweight; Super-bantamweight

Boxing career
- Reach: 68 in (173 cm)
- Stance: Orthodox

Boxing record
- Total fights: 52
- Wins: 35
- Win by KO: 18
- Losses: 11
- Draws: 6

Norbelto Irenes Jiménez Lorenzo (born 26 February 1991) is a Dominican professional boxer. He is a two-time world title challenger, having fought for the WBA super-flyweight title in 2014 and 2019.

== Boxing career ==
Jimenez made his professional debut against Juan Pichardo on 25 February 2010. He lost the fight by majority decision. Despite beginning his career with a 1–7 run, Jimenez would amass an 18–8–2 record during the next four years, before being booked to face Julio Escudero for the vacant WBA Fedelatin super flyweight title on 28 June 2014. He won the fight by unanimous decision, with scores of 109–100, 108–102 and 109–100.

After successfully defending the Dominican super flyweight title, which he won with a third-round stoppage of Esteban Aquino on 2 February 2014, against Aneudy Matos on 21 September 2014, Jimenez challenged the reigning WBA World super flyweight champion Kohei Kono on 31 December 2014. Kano retained the title by split decision. One judge scored the fight 116–111 for Kano, the second scored it 115–112 for Jimenez, while the third judge scored the bout an even 114–114.

Following his first failed title bid, Jimenez faced Jesus Vargas on 18 April 2015, back in his native Santo Domingo. He won the fight by unanimous decision, with all three judges awarding him all ten rounds of the bout. Jimenez won his next eight successive bouts, before being booked to challenge the WBA super flyweight title Kal Yafai on 29 June 2019, at the Dunkin' Donuts Center in Providence, Ohio, on the undercard of the Demetrius Andrade and Maciej Sulecki middleweight title bout. Jimenez suffered his first loss in eight years, as he lost the fight by unanimous decision, with scores of 117–109, 119–107 and 118–108.

Jimenez challenged the WBC International super flyweight champion Aliu Bamidele Lasisi on 6 March 2020, in the main event of an ESPN+ broadcast card. The fight was ruled a split decision draw, with scores of 95–95, 96–94 and 94–96. Jimenez faced Marvin Solano, in his second and final fight of the year, on 17 December 2020. He won the fight by unanimous decision, with scores of 79–72, 79–72 and 78–73.

Jimenez faced the former four-weight world champion Donnie Nietes in a WBO super-flyweight title eliminator on 11 December 2021. Aside from a title shot, Nietes' WBO International super-flyweight belt was on the line as well. The fight was ruled a split decision draw, with scores of 96–94, 94–96 and 95–95. Jimenez faced the former WBA super-flyweight title challenger Keyvin Lara (31–4–1) on 8 April 2022. He won the fight by unanimous decision, with scores of 97–93, 98–92 and 97–93.

Jimenez was booked to face the former WBA (Regular) super-flyweight titleholder Andrew Moloney on 16 October 2022. He lost the fight by unanimous decision.

== Professional boxing record ==
52 fights	35 wins	11 losses
By knockout	18	5
By decision	16	6
By disqualification	1	0
Draws	6	

No.	Result	Record	Opponent	Type	Round, time	Date	Location	Notes
52	Win	35–11–6	Marcelino Nieves	UD	10	17 May 2025	Pabellon de Karate, Centro Olimpico, Santo Domingo, Dominican Republic	
51	Loss	34–11–6	Noel Reyes Cepeda	RTD	2 (12), 3:00	19 Dec 2024	Pabellon de Karate, Centro Olimpico, Santo Domingo, Dominican Republic	
50	Win	34–10–6	Leonard Sanchez Gonzalez	UD	8	30 Aug 2024	Santo Domingo, Dominican Republic	
49	Win	33–10–6	Anyelo Munoz	TKO	4 (8)	9 Feb 2024	Coco Locos Restaurant Sports Bar, Sosua, Dominican Republic	
48	Win	32–10–6	Gilbert Gonzalez	TKO	2 (8), 2:40	30 Jun 2023	Club Mauricio Baez, Santo Domingo, Dominican Republic	
47	Loss	31–10–6	Andrew Moloney	UD	10	16 Oct 2022	Rod Laver Arena, Melbourne, Australia	For vacant WBO International super-flyweight title
46	Win	31–9–6	Keyvin Lara	UD	10	8 Apr 2022	Centro Olimpico, Santo Domingo, Dominican Republic	
45	Draw	30–9–6	Donnie Nietes	SD	10	11 Dec 2021	Coca-Cola Arena, Dubai, United Arab Emirates	For WBO International super-flyweight title
44	Win	30–9–5	Marvin Solano	UD	8	17 Dec 2020	Hotel Catalonia Malecon Center, Santo Domingo, Dominican Republic	
43	Draw	29–9–5	Aliu Bamidele Lasisi	SD	10	6 Mar 2020	Caesars Palace Dubai, Dubai, Dominican Republic	For WBC International super-flyweight title
42	Loss	29–9–4	Kal Yafai	UD	12	29 Jun 2019	Dunkin' Donuts Center, Providence, Ohio, U.S.	For WBA (Super) super-flyweight title
41	Win	29–8–4	Renson Robles	UD	10	23 Jun 2018	Club el Millon, Santo Domingo, Dominican Republic	
40	Win	28–8–4	Reysi Rosa	TKO	2 (10), 0:38	22 Dec 2017	Los Prados Social Club, Santo Domingo, Dominican Republic	
39	Win	27–8–4	Donny Garcia	TKO	9 (10), 1:08	24 Jun 2017	Hotel Jaragua, Santo Domingo, Dominican Republic	
38	Win	26–8–4	Luis Alberto Zarraga	TKO	2 (10), 1:06	24 Feb 2017	Maunoloa Night Club y Casino, Santo Domingo, Dominican Republic	
37	Win	25–8–4	Felix Machado	TKO	6 (8), 2:29	15 Dec 2016	Maunoloa Night Club y Casino, Santo Domingo, Dominican Republic	
36	Win	24–8–4	Renson Robles	UD	10	16 Jul 2016	Club el Millon, Santo Domingo, Dominican Republic	
35	Win	23–8–4	Manuel Gonzalez Garcia	TKO	7 (12), 2:06	14 Nov 2015	Sosua Convention Center, Puerto Plata, Dominican Republic	
34	Win	22–8–4	Anyelo Munoz	TKO	4 (10), 0:25	11 Jul 2015	Polideportivo de Villa Francisca, Santo Domingo, Dominican Republic	Retained Dominican Republic super-flyweight title
33	Win	21–8–4	Jesus Vargas	UD	10	18 Apr 2015	Coliseo Carlos 'Teo' Cruz, Santo Domingo, Dominican Republic	
32	Draw	20–8–4	Kohei Kono	SD	12	31 Dec 2014	Ota-City General Gymnasium, Tokyo, Japan	For WBA (Super) super-flyweight title
31	Win	20–8–3	Aneudy Matos	DQ	1 (12), 2:18	21 Sep 2014	Coliseo Carlos 'Teo' Cruz, Santo Domingo, Dominican Republic	Retained Dominican Republic super-flyweight title
30	Win	19–8–3	Julio Escudero	UD	11	28 Jun 2014	Sheraton Hotel, Santo Domingo, Dominican Republic	Won vacant WBA Fedelatin super-flyweight title
29	Win	18–8–3	Esteban Aquino	RTD	3 (10), 3:00	2 Feb 2014	Polideportivo, Villa Altagracia, Dominican Republic	Won vacant Dominican Republic super-flyweight title
28	Win	17–8–3	Aneurys Mesa Rodriguez	UD	8	18 Oct 2013	Polideportivo San Martin de Porre, La Romana, Dominican Republic	
27	Win	16–8–3	Ambiorix Ciriaco	UD	6	31 Aug 2013	Sosua Bay Grand Casino, Puerto Plata, Dominican Republic	
26	Win	15–8–3	Elvin Rodriguez	TKO	3 (8), 2:46	4 Aug 2013	Gimnasio Boxing Factory, Santiago de los Caballeros, Dominican Republic	
25	Draw	14–8–3	Eliezer Aquino	TD	5 (10), 3:00	18 May 2013	Club Mauricio Baez, Santo Domingo, Dominican Republic	Retained WBA Fedecentro super-flyweight title
24	Win	14–8–2	Danny Aquino	UD	8	9 Mar 2013	Coliseo Carlos 'Teo' Cruz, Santo Domingo, Dominican Republic	Won WBC FECARBOX interim and vacant WBA Fedecentro super-flyweight title
23	Win	13–8–2	Juan Carlos Rosales	TKO	4 (6), 2:34	3 Feb 2013	Club Juan Antonio Alix, Santiago de los Caballeros, Dominican Republic	
22	Win	12–8–2	Armando Lachapelle	UD	8	15 Jan 2013	Gimnasio Joan Guzman, Guachupita, Dominican Republic	
21	Win	11–8–2	Jose Reyes Perez	TKO	1 (6), 0:51	21 Dec 2012	Club Luz y Progreso, Santiago de los Caballeros, Dominican Republic	
20	Win	10–8–2	Rafael Sandoval	TKO	3 (6), 2:47	28 Nov 2012	Gimnasio Joan Guzman, Santo Domingo, Dominican Republic	
19	Win	9–8–2	Ramon Bueno	TKO	2 (6), 2:13	16 Nov 2012	Club el Millon, Santo Domingo, Dominican Republic	
18	Win	8–8–2	Dinoel Reynoso	UD	4	10 Nov 2012	Club el Millon, Santo Domingo, Dominican Republic	
17	Win	7–8–2	Nelson Diaz	TKO	1 (6), 1:13	18 Oct 2012	Club el Millon, Santo Domingo, Dominican Republic	
16	Win	6–8–2	Jose Ramon Tejada	TKO	1 (6), 2:46	2 Oct 2012	Gimnasio Joan Guzman, Guachupita, Dominican Republic	
15	Win	5–8–2	Alfonso Sandoval	TKO	1 (6), 1:37	16 Sep 2012	Club Pueblo Nuevo, Villa Duarte, Dominican Republic	
14	Win	4–8–2	Marcos Martinez	TKO	1 (6), 2:26	12 Sep 2012	Club Maquiteria, Villa Duarte, Dominican Republic	
13	Draw	3–8–2	Julio Cesar Paniagua	MD	4	12 May 2012	Coliseo Pedro Julio Nolasco, La Romana, Dominican Republic	
12	Win	3–8–1	Ramon Cedano Gil	MD	4	25 Nov 2011	Coliseo Carlos 'Teo' Cruz, Santo Domingo, Dominican Republic	
11	Loss	2–8–1	Ruben Vicente	MD	4	25 Nov 2011	Coliseo Carlos 'Teo' Cruz, Santo Domingo, Dominican Republic	
10	Draw	2–7–1	Luis Cosme	SD	4	30 Apr 2011	Parque del Este, Santo Domingo, Dominican Republic	
9	Win	2–7	Carlos Rodriguez Contreras	SD	4	26 Mar 2011	Club de Villa Gonzales, Santiago de los Caballeros, Dominican Republic	
8	Loss	1–7	Luis Hinojosa	UD	6	26 Feb 2011	Cancha Club, San Francisco de Macoris, Dominican Republic	
7	Loss	1–6	Juan Gabriel Guzman Pichardo	KO	3 (8), 2:34	31 Jan 2011	Discoteca Las Vegas, Santiago de los Caballeros, Dominican Republic	
6	Loss	1–5	Daniel Ramirez	SD	4	18 Dec 2010	Multiuso, La Vega, Dominican Republic	
5	Win	1–4	Ruben Vicente	UD	4	29 Nov 2010	Coliseo Pepe Mayen, San Pedro de Macoris, Dominican Republic	
4	Loss	0–4	Juan Carlos Payano	TKO	2 (6)	9 Oct 2010	La Vega, Dominican Republic	
3	Loss	0–3	Carlos Manuel Reyes	KO	1 (8), 1:58	19 Aug 2010	Dominican Fiesta Hotel & Casino, Santo Domingo, Dominican Republic	
2	Loss	0–2	Oscauris Frias	TKO	3 (6), 1:14	5 Jun 2010	Polideportivo, Nagua, Dominican Republic	
1	Loss	0–1	Juan Gabriel Guzman Pichardo	MD	4	25 Feb 2010	Bruno Car Wash, Santo Domingo, Dominican Republic	
