= Zaur Abdullaev =

Russian boxer (born 1994)

Personal information
- Nationality: Russian
- Born: 23 March 1994 (age 32) Dydymkin, Stavropol Krai, Russia
- Height: 5 ft 9 in (175 cm)
- Weight: Lightweight

Boxing career
- Reach: 72 in (183 cm)
- Stance: Orthodox

Boxing record
- Total fights: 24
- Wins: 21
- Win by KO: 12
- Losses: 3

Zaur Magomedalievich Abdullaev (Russian: Заур Магомедалиевич Абдуллаев; born 23 March 1994) is a Russian professional boxer who challenged for the WBC interim lightweight title in 2019.

== Professional career ==
Abdullaev made his professional debut on 4 March 2017, scoring a first-round technical knockout (TKO) victory over Sardorbek Kamilov at the Sports Complex Leader in Berezovsky, Russia.

After compiling a record of 7–0 (5 KOs) he defeated Ardie Boyose on 10 February 2018 at the DIVS, Yekaterinburg, Russia, capturing the WBO Youth lightweight title via seventh-round TKO. At the time of the stoppage all three judges had Abdullaev winning with scores of 60–54, 59–55 and 59–55.

In his next fight he defeated Deiner Berrio via unanimous decision (UD) on 22 April at DIVS to capture the vacant WBC Silver lightweight title. Two judges scored the bout 117–111 and the third scored it 115–113.

He retained the title by UD against Hank Lundy in September, followed by a TKO win in a non-title fight against Humberto Martínez in February 2019 before facing Devin Haney for the vacant WBC interim lightweight title. The bout took place on 13 September 2019 at the Hulu Theater in New York City. Abdullaev suffered the first defeat of his career, losing by fourth-round corner retirement (RTD) after Abdullaev's corner pulled him out of the bout before the start of the fifth round.

Following his failed title bid, Abdullaev faced Pavel Malikov on 22 August 2020. He won the fight by a seventh-round knockout, after knocking Malikov down once in the fifth round and twice in rounds four and six. Abdullaev faced the journeyman Zhora Hamazaryan on 27 March 2021, and won the fight by unanimous decision, with scores of 94–93, 96–91 and 95–92.

After successfully bouncing back from his first professional loss, Abdullaev was booked to face Dejan Zlatičanin for the vacant WBC Silver lightweight title on 11 September 2021. He won the fight by unanimous decision, with scores of 118–110, 119–109 and 117–111. Abdullaev is scheduled to face the former three-weight world champion Jorge Linares in his first title defense on 19 February 2022. He won the fight by a twelfth-round technical knockout. Adbullaev knocked Linares down twice in the last round of the bout, before forcing a referee stoppage with a flurry of punches at the 2:28 minute mark.

Abdullaev faced Raymond Muratalla for the vacant IBF interim lightweight title at Pechanga Arena in San Diego on 10 May 2025, losing by unanimous decision.

He was due to fight Adam Azim at Tottenham Hotspur Stadium in London on 15 November 2025. However, he withdrew on 17 October 2025, after he was unable to obtain a visa.

== Professional boxing record ==
24 fights	21 wins	3 losses
By knockout	13	1
By decision	8	2

No.	Result	Record	Opponent	Type	Round, time	Date	Location	Notes
24	Loss	21–3	Khariton Agrba	SD	12	10 Oct 2026	RCC Boxing Academy, Ekaterinburg, Russia	For vacant WBA interim super lightweight title
23	Win	21–2	Hugo Alberto Roldan	KO	6 (10), 2:44	22 Nov 2025	RCC Boxing Academy, Ekaterinburg, Russia	Won vacant WBA Gold super lightweight title
22	Loss	20–2	Raymond Muratalla	UD	12	10 May 2025	Pechanga Arena, San Diego, California, U.S.	For vacant IBF interim lightweight title
21	Win	20–1	Juan Javier Carrasco	TKO	12 (12)	19 Oct 2024	Estadio Cubierto Aconcagua Arena, Mendoza, Argentina	
20	Win	19–1	Roger Gutiérrez	UD	10	10 Feb 2024	KRK Uralets, Ekaterinburg, Russia	
19	Win	18–1	Roman Andreev	RTD	3 (10), 3:00	8 Sep 2023	Traktor Ice Arena, Chelyabinsk, Russia	
18	Win	17–1	Ricardo Nunez	UD	10	7 Mar 2023	DIVS, Ekaterinburg, Russia	
17	Win	16–1	Jovanni Straffon	RTD	5 (10), 3:00	11 Sep 2022	Traktor Ice Arena, Chelyabinsk, Russia	
16	Win	15–1	Jorge Linares	TKO	12 (12), 2:28	19 Feb 2022	RCC Boxing Academy, Ekaterinburg, Russia	Retained WBC Silver lightweight title
15	Win	14–1	Dejan Zlatičanin	UD	12	11 Sep 2021	RCC Boxing Academy, Ekaterinburg, Russia	Won vacant WBC Silver lightweight title
14	Win	13–1	Zhora Hamazaryan	UD	10	27 Mar 2021	RCC Boxing Academy, Ekaterinburg, Russia	
13	Win	12–1	Pavel Malikov	KO	7 (10), 1:24	22 Aug 2020	RCC Boxing Academy, Ekaterinburg, Russia	
12	Loss	11–1	Devin Haney	RTD	4 (12), 3:00	13 Sep 2019	Hulu Theater, New York City, New York, US	For WBC interim lightweight title
11	Win	11–0	Humberto Martínez	TKO	10 (10), 2:31	22 Feb 2019	KRK Uralets, Ekaterinburg, Russia	
10	Win	10–0	Hank Lundy	UD	12	7 Sep 2018	Traktor Ice Arena, Chelyabinsk, Russia	Retained WBC Silver lightweight title
9	Win	9–0	Deiner Berrio	UD	12	22 Apr 2018	DIVS, Ekaterinburg, Russia	Won vacant WBC Silver lightweight title
8	Win	8–0	Ardie Boyose	TKO	7 (10), 2:20	10 Feb 2018	DIVS, Ekaterinburg, Russia	Won vacant WBO Youth lightweight title
7	Win	7–0	Roberto Gonzales	TKO	7 (8), 2:51	15 Dec 2017	DIVS, Ekaterinburg, Russia	
6	Win	6–0	Ziyoyidin Tokhirov	KO	4 (8), 1:18	9 Sep 2017	Traktor Ice Arena, Chelyabinsk, Russia	
5	Win	5–0	Mao Kawanishi	UD	4	9 Jul 2017	DIVS, Ekaterinburg, Russia	
4	Win	4–0	Dmitry Ganiev	RTD	5 (6), 3:00	5 May 2017	DIVS, Ekaterinburg, Russia	
3	Win	3–0	Sherzodbek Mamajonov	RTD	3 (6), 3:00	2 May 2017	Dom Pechati, Ekaterinburg, Russia	
2	Win	2–0	Sharobidden Jurakhonov	UD	4	25 Mar 2017	PNTZ Palace of Culture, Pervouralsk, Russia	
1	Win	1–0	Sardorbek Kamilov	TKO	1 (4), 1:15	4 Mar 2017	Sports Complex Leader, Berezovsky, Russia	
