= Elton Dharry =

Guyanese boxer (born 1985)

Personal information
- Nationality: Guyanese
- Born: 1 December 1985 (age 40) Enterprise, Demerara-Mahaica, Guyana
- Height: 5 ft 6 in (168 cm)
- Weight: Super-flyweight; Bantamweight

Boxing career
- Stance: Orthodox

Boxing record
- Total fights: 33
- Wins: 26
- Win by KO: 15
- Losses: 6
- Draws: 1

Elton Felix Dharry (born 1 December 1985) is a Guyanese professional boxer who challenged for the WBA interim super-flyweight title in 2019.

== Professional career ==
Dharry has held the Guyana National and IBF Intercontinental bantamweight, and the WBA Fedecentro super-flyweight titles between 2013 and 2019.

In 2013, his win against Rudolph Hedge of Jamaica for the World Boxing Union (WBU) bantamweight title made him the first Guyanese to win a world title on home soil.

Dharry is based out of Brooklyn, New York.
