= Alexis Rocha =

American professional boxer (born 1997)

Personal information
- Nickname: Lex
- Born: July 7, 1997 (age 29) Santa Ana, California, U.S.
- Height: 5 ft 9 in (175 cm)
- Weight: Welterweight

Boxing career
- Reach: 70 in (178 cm)
- Stance: Southpaw

Boxing record
- Total fights: 30
- Wins: 27
- Win by KO: 16
- Losses: 2
- Draws: 1

Alexis Rocha (born July 7, 1997) is an American professional boxer. He has held several regional welterweight championships, including the WBC Continental Americas and WBO–NABO titles.

== Amateur career ==
Rocha began boxing after following his older brother, former world-title challenger Ronny Rios, into the sport. His amateur achievements included winning the 2012 Junior Olympics and earning a silver medal at the 2012 Veles Cup in Russia.

== Professional career ==
Rocha made his professional debut on March 4, 2016, defeating Jordan Rosario by third-round knockout at Belasco Theater in Los Angeles. He won his first 16 fights before suffering his first professional defeat against Rashidi Ellis via unanimous decision at Fantasy Springs Resort Casino in Indio, California on October 30, 2020.

=== Rocha vs. Cobbs ===
On March 19, 2022, Rocha faced unbeaten contender Blair Cobbs at the Galen Center in Los Angeles. Rocha knocked Cobbs down in the eighth round before stopping him in the ninth.

Rocha subsequently defeated Luis Alberto Verón to win the vacant WBO–NABO welterweight title at Crypto.com Arena in Los Angeles on July 16, 2022. Over the next 10 months he retained the title against Jesús Antonio Pérez. George Ashie and Anthony Young.

=== Rocha vs. Santillan ===
Rocha defended his WBO–NABO title against unbeaten Giovani Santillan on October 21, 2023, at the Kia Forum in Inglewood, California. Santillan knocked him down three times and won by sixth-round knockout, handing Rocha his second professional defeat.

=== Rocha vs. Curiel ===
After recording two victories, Rocha faced undefeated Raúl Curiel at Toyota Arena in Ontario, California, on December 14, 2024. The 12-round bout ended in a majority draw, with one judge scoring it 116–112 for Rocha and the other two scoring it 114–114.

=== Rocha vs. Diaz ===
Following a 15-month layoff, Rocha returned on March 14, 2026, to face former world champion Joseph Diaz over 10 rounds at the Honda Center in Anaheim, California. He won by unanimous decision.

=== Rocha vs. Ramírez ===
On September 12, 2026, Rocha faced former unified light-welterweight champion José Ramírez at T-Mobile Arena in Las Vegas. He won by unanimous decision, with scores of 98–91, 98–91 and 97–92.

=== Rocha vs. Walker ===
Rocha is scheduled to face Conah Walker in an eliminator for a shot at the WBA welterweight title at University of Wolverhampton at The Halls in Wolverhampton, England, on December 5, 2026.

== Professional boxing record ==
30 fights	27 wins	2 losses
By knockout	16	1
By decision	11	1
Draws	1	

No.	Result	Record	Opponent	Type	Round, time	Date	Location	Notes
30	Win	27–2–1	José Ramírez	UD	10	12 Sep 2026	T-Mobile Arena, Paradise, Nevada, U.S.	
29	Win	26–2–1	Joseph Diaz	UD	10	14 Mar 2026	Honda Center, Anaheim, California, U.S.	
28	Draw	25–2–1	Raúl Curiel	MD	12	14 Dec 2024	Toyota Arena, Ontario, California, U.S.	Retained WBO–NABO welterweight title, for NABF welterweight title
27	Win	25–2	Santiago Domínguez	UD	10	19 Jul 2024	Fantasy Springs Resort Casino, Indio, California, U.S.	Won vacant WBO–NABO welterweight title
26	Win	24–2	Fredrick Lawson	RTD	7 (10), 3:00	30 Mar 2024	YouTube Theater, Inglewood, California, U.S.	
25	Loss	23–2	Giovani Santillan	KO	6 (12), 1:13	21 Oct 2023	Kia Forum, Inglewood, California, U.S.	Lost WBO–NABO welterweight title
24	Win	23–1	Anthony Young	KO	5 (12), 2:15	27 May 2023	Fantasy Springs Resort Casino, Indio, California, U.S.	Retained WBO–NABO welterweight title
23	Win	22–1	George Ashie	KO	7 (12), 2:08	28 Jan 2023	YouTube Theater, Inglewood, California, U.S.	Retained WBO–NABO welterweight title
22	Win	21–1	Jesús Antonio Pérez	UD	10	29 Oct 2022	Pechanga Arena, San Diego, California, U.S.	Retained WBO–NABO welterweight title
21	Win	20–1	Luis Alberto Verón	UD	10	16 Jul 2022	Crypto.com Arena, Los Angeles, California, U.S.	Won vacant WBO–NABO welterweight title
20	Win	19–1	Blair Cobbs	KO	9 (10), 0:44	19 Mar 2022	Galen Center, Los Angeles, California, U.S.	
19	Win	18–1	Jeovanis Barraza	KO	9 (10), 0:33	13 Nov 2021	Honda Center, Anaheim, California, U.S.	
18	Win	17–1	James Bacon	UD	10	19 Jun 2021	Don Haskins Center, El Paso, Texas, U.S.	
17	Loss	16–1	Rashidi Ellis	UD	12	30 Oct 2020	Fantasy Springs Resort Casino, Indio, California, U.S.	For vacant WBC International welterweight title
16	Win	16–0	Brad Solomon	UD	10	14 Feb 2020	Honda Center, Anaheim, California, U.S.	Retained WBC Continental Americas welterweight title
15	Win	15–0	Roberto Valenzuela Jr.	RTD	5 (10), 3:00	13 Dec 2019	Fantasy Springs Resort Casino, Indio, California, U.S.	Retained WBC Continental Americas welterweight title
14	Win	14–0	Berlin Abreu	TKO	8 (10), 2:56	13 Jul 2019	Dignity Health Sports Park, Carson, California, U.S.	Retained WBC Continental Americas welterweight title
13	Win	13–0	Shoki Sakai	UD	10	25 Apr 2019	Fantasy Springs Resort Casino, Indio, California, U.S.	Retained WBC Continental Americas welterweight title
12	Win	12–0	Carlos Ortiz Cervantes	UD	8	15 Sep 2018	T-Mobile Arena, Paradise, Nevada, U.S.	
11	Win	11–0	Miguel Dumas	KO	1 (8), 1:49	9 Mar 2018	The Hangar, Costa Mesa, California, U.S.	Won vacant WBC Continental Americas welterweight title
10	Win	10–0	Pascual Salgado	KO	1 (8), 1:46	16 Nov 2017	Polifórum Benito Juárez, Cancún, Quintana Roo, Mexico	
9	Win	9–0	Esau Herrera	KO	1 (6), 2:59	26 Aug 2017	Dignity Health Sports Park, Carson, California, U.S.	
8	Win	8–0	Cesar Valenzuela	UD	8	2 Jun 2017	Belasco Theater, Los Angeles, California, U.S.	
7	Win	7–0	Marcus Beckford	RTD	4 (6), 3:00	10 Mar 2017	Belasco Theater, Los Angeles, California, U.S.	
6	Win	6–0	Abraham Calderon	UD	4	16 Dec 2016	Fantasy Springs Resort Casino, Indio, California, U.S.	
5	Win	5–0	Colbert Lozoya	KO	1 (6), 1:40	30 Sep 2016	Fantasy Springs Resort Casino, Indio, California, U.S.	
4	Win	4–0	Israel Villela	TKO	1 (6), 1:18	19 Aug 2016	Belasco Theater, Los Angeles, California, U.S.	
3	Win	3–0	Anthony Woods	UD	4	4 Jun 2016	StubHub Center, Carson, California, U.S.	
2	Win	2–0	Abdel Vera	TKO	1 (4), 2:18	6 May 2016	Toshiba Plaza, Paradise, Nevada, U.S.	
1	Win	1–0	Jordan Rosario	KO	3 (4), 1:43	4 Mar 2016	Belasco Theater, Los Angeles, California, U.S.	
