= David Papot =

French professional boxing contender

Personal information
- Nickname: L'Enfant de Penhoët
- Nationality: French
- Born: 3 March 1991 (age 35) Saint-Nazaire, France
- Height: 1.78 m (5 ft 10 in)

Boxing career
- Stance: Southpaw

Boxing record
- Total fights: 33
- Wins: 31
- Win by KO: 5
- Losses: 1
- Draws: 1

David Papot (born 3 March 1991) is a French professional boxer. He has held regional titles in three weight classes, including the WBA Continental middleweight title, the French light-middleweight title and the IBF International welterweight title.

== Amateur career ==
Papot began boxing at the age of eight and competed in 102 amateur bouts. He represented the French national team in 30 contests and reached the quarter-finals of the European Championships. He was also a French senior champion and a two-time French junior champion.

== Professional career ==
Papot made his professional debut in October 2013. In March 2017, he defeated Dzmitry Atrokhau by unanimous decision to win the vacant WBA Continental middleweight title. He subsequently won the French light-middleweight title against Barthélemy Lefebvre.

=== Papot vs. Paro ===
On 18 September 2025, Papot faced former world champion Liam Paro in an IBF welterweight title eliminator at the Pat Rafter Arena in Brisbane, Australia. Papot troubled Paro during the middle rounds and caused significant swelling around his right eye, but lost by unanimous decision. The judges scored the bout 117–111 and 116–112 twice. It was the first defeat of Papot's professional career.

=== Papot vs. Eubank ===
Papot returned on 18 July 2026 to face Harlem Eubank for the vacant IBF International welterweight title at the Copper Box Arena in London. Papot knocked Eubank down three times, while being knocked down himself in the seventh round. He won by unanimous decision, with scores of 115–110, 113–111 and 115–109.

== Professional boxing record ==
33 fights	31 wins	1 loss
By knockout	5	0
By decision	26	1
Draws	1	

No.	Result	Record	Opponent	Type	Round, time	Date	Location	Notes
33	Win	31–1–1	Harlem Eubank	UD	12	18 Jul 2026	Copper Box Arena, Queen Elizabeth Olympic Park, London, England	Won vacant IBF International welterweight title
32	Loss	30–1–1	Liam Paro	UD	12	18 Sep 2025	Pat Rafter Arena, Tennyson, Queensland, Australia	IBF welterweight title eliminator
31	Win	30–0–1	Josh Wagner	KO	7 (12), 3:00	22 Nov 2024	Zénith Nantes Métropole, Nantes, France	Retained IBF International and WBO Global welterweight titles
30	Win	29–0–1	Jon Miguez	UD	12	12 Apr 2024	Zénith Nantes Métropole, Nantes, France	Won vacant WBO Global welterweight title
29	Win	28–0–1	Jemal Shalamberidze	PTS	6	23 Mar 2024	Complexe sportif du Pilori, Campbon, France	
28	Win	27–0–1	Bilel Jkitou	UD	12	25 Nov 2022	Zénith Nantes Métropole, Nantes, France	Retained IBA super-welterweight title
27	Win	26–0–1	Ahmed El Mousaoui	SD	12	4 Jun 2022	Zénith Nantes Métropole, Nantes, France	Retained IBA super-welterweight title
26	Win	25–0–1	Evgeny Terentiev	TKO	5 (12)	11 Jun 2021	Chapiteau Celtic Fighters, Guérande, France	Won vacant IBA super-welterweight title
25	Win	24–0–1	Francis Tchoffo	UD	8	21 Aug 2020	Chapiteau Zavatta, Guérande, France	
24	Win	23–0–1	Vaghinak Tamrazyan	UD	8	8 Nov 2019	Chapiteau Luna Park, Guérande, France	
23	Draw	22–0–1	James McGirt	SD	12	7 Jun 2019	Turning Stone Resort Casino, Verona, New York, U.S.	For vacant WBO International middleweight title
22	Win	22–0	Fouad El Massoudi	UD	10	4 May 2018	Salle la Soucoupe, Saint-Nazaire, France	Retained French super-welterweight title
21	Win	21–0	Romain Garofalo	UD	10	16 Feb 2018	Salle la Soucoupe, Saint-Nazaire, France	Retained French super-welterweight title
20	Win	20–0	Barthélemy Lefebvre	UD	10	20 Oct 2017	Salle la Soucoupe, Saint-Nazaire, France	Won vacant French super-welterweight title
19	Win	19–0	Dzmitry Atrokhau	UD	12	31 Mar 2017	Gymnase Coubertin, Saint-Nazaire, France	Won vacant WBA Continental middleweight title
18	Win	18–0	Kevin Bertogal	PTS	6	26 Nov 2016	Salle Gambetta, Mayenne, France	
17	Win	17–0	Joël Duchemin	TKO	1 (8)	28 Oct 2016	Salle la Soucoupe, Saint-Nazaire, France	
16	Win	16–0	Ionuț Trandafir	PTS	6	28 May 2016	Salle C.M.S., Châteaubriant, France	
15	Win	15–0	Kevin Bertogal	UD	8	22 Apr 2016	Salle la Soucoupe, Saint-Nazaire, France	
14	Win	14–0	Yuri Pompilio	UD	6	26 Mar 2016	Complexe sportif des Hauts d'Auxerre, Auxerre, France	
13	Win	13–0	Karim Menasria	TKO	4 (8)	12 Feb 2016	Salle la Soucoupe, Saint-Nazaire, France	
12	Win	12–0	Sandy Messaoud	TKO	7 (8), 1:15	30 Oct 2015	Salle la Soucoupe, Saint-Nazaire, France	
11	Win	11–0	Flavien Bruno Bogongo	UD	6	5 Jun 2015	Parc des Sports, Pont-Audemer, France	
10	Win	10–0	Jérôme Hirigoyen	UD	6	17 Apr 2015	Salle la Soucoupe, Saint-Nazaire, France	
9	Win	9–0	Sacramento Pereira Fernandes	UD	6	7 Feb 2015	Hall des Sports Pierre Gaspard, Épernay, France	
8	Win	8–0	Mahmoud Khayat	DQ	2 (4)	23 Jan 2015	Salle la Soucoupe, Saint-Nazaire, France	
7	Win	7–0	Junior Kamadjou	PTS	6	15 Nov 2014	Zénith de Limoges, Limoges, France	
6	Win	6–0	Sophyan Haoud	PTS	4	24 Oct 2014	Salle la Soucoupe, Saint-Nazaire, France	
5	Win	5–0	Flavien Bruno Bogongo	PTS	4	23 May 2014	Salle la Soucoupe, Saint-Nazaire, France	
4	Win	4–0	Patrick Momene Mokamba	PTS	4	21 Mar 2014	Salle la Soucoupe, Saint-Nazaire, France	
3	Win	3–0	Ali Khavari	PTS	4	24 Jan 2014	Salle la Soucoupe, Saint-Nazaire, France	
2	Win	2–0	Amrane Ramdane	PTS	4	7 Dec 2013	Les Sables-d'Olonne, France	
1	Win	1–0	Guy Yitenze Njyou	PTS	4	19 Oct 2013	Salle la Soucoupe, Saint-Nazaire, France	
