= Blair Cobbs =

American boxer (born 1989)

Personal information
- Nickname: The Flair
- Born: December 30, 1989 (age 36) Philadelphia, Pennsylvania, U.S.
- Height: 5 ft 11 1/2 in (182 cm)
- Weight: Welterweight

Boxing career
- Stance: Southpaw

Boxing record
- Total fights: 20
- Wins: 18
- Win by KO: 11
- Losses: 1
- Draws: 1

Blair Romero Cobbs (born December 30, 1989) is an American professional boxer. He is a former WBC-NABF welterweight title holder.

== Early life ==
Cobbs was born on December 30, 1989, in Philadelphia, Pennsylvania. He moved with his mother from city to city until his she died when he was 11 years old, at which time he moved in with his grandmother. Following his grandmother's death he lived with his father, Eugene Cobbs, eventually relocating to Guadalajara, Mexico, after his father became a fugitive from the FBI. It was in Guadalajara where Cobbs found boxing.

== Professional career ==
Cobbs made his professional debut on June 28, 2013, scoring a first-round knockout (KO) victory over Martique Holland at Lera's Baile Mexicano in Ruffin, North Carolina.

After compiling a record of 9–0–1 (6 KOs) he faced Ferdinand Kerobyan for the vacant WBC-NABF Junior welterweight title on March 21, 2019, at The Avalon in Los Angeles, California. Kerobyan suffered a cut in the first round from an accidental clash of heads, which Cobbs targeted with sharp jabs. With Cobbs' hand speed being the decisive factor, he went on to win by unanimous decision (UD) to capture his first professional title. One judge scored the bout 79–73 and the other two scored it 77–75.

After a sixth-round knockout (KO) victory against Robert Redmond Jr. in a non-title bout in June, Cobbs made the first defence of his title against Steve Villalobos on August 22 at the Fantasy Springs Resort Casino in Indio, California. After an even back-and-forth fight for the first five rounds, Cobbs suffered the first knockdown of his career in the sixth after being stunned by a right followed by a flurry of punches to send him to the canvas. After taking control in rounds seven and eight, Cobbs ended the fight in the ninth after landing a series of uppercuts followed by a right hand to send Villalobos stumbling into the ropes and onto the canvas, giving Cobbs the KO win.

His next fight came against Carlos Ortiz for the vacant WBC-NABF welterweight title on November 2, 2019, at the MGM Grand Garden Arena in Paradise, Nevada. The bout served as part of the undercard for Canelo Álvarez vs. Sergey Kovalev. After suffering a knockdown in the first round – a punch from Ortiz grazed the back of Cobbs' head, causing him to stumble and touch the canvas with his left hand and knee – Cobbs scored a knockdown of his own in the sixth with a counter left hook. Ortiz made it to his feet to see out the remainder of the round, only for his corner to pull him out of the contest before the start of the seventh, handing Cobbs a stoppage win via seventh-round corner retirement (RTD).

The first defense of his newly acquired title came on February 14, 2020, against Samuel Kotey Neequaye at the Honda Center in Anaheim, California. In a fight which saw Cobbs stay behind the jab and box at range, he received a point deduction in round nine for punching below the belt en route to a split decision (SD) victory. Two judges scored the bout 96–93 in favour of Cobbs while the third scored it 95–94 to Neequaye.

On June 19, 2021, Cobbs stopped Brad Solomon in the fifth round at Don Haskins Center in El Paso, Texas.

He then suffered the first loss of his professional career when he was knocked out in the ninth round by Alexis Rocha at the Galen Center in Los Angeles on March 19, 2022.

Cobbs got back to winning ways in his next fight, defeating Maurice Hooker via unanimous decision at Dickies Arena in Fort Worth, Texas, on August 6, 2022, in a contest where he knocked his opponent to the canvas three times.

It would be almost two years until his next bout, a unanimous decision win over Adrien Broner on June 7, 2024, at Hard Rock Hotel and Casino in Hollywood, Florida.

== Professional boxing record ==
| 20 fights | 18 wins | 1 loss |
|---|---|---|
| By knockout | 11 | 1 |
| By decision | 7 | 0 |
| Draws | 1 | |

Key to abbreviations used for results
| DQ | Disqualification | RTD | Corner retirement |
| KO | Knockout | SD | Split decision / split draw |
| MD | Majority decision / majority draw | TD | Technical decision / technical draw |
| NC | No contest | TKO | Technical knockout |
| PTS | Points decision | UD | Unanimous decision / unanimous draw |

Boxing record
| No. | Result | Record | Opponent | Type | Round(s), time | Date | Location | Notes |
|---|---|---|---|---|---|---|---|---|
| 20 | Win | 18–1–1 | Andres Sanchez Ramirez | TKO | 3 (6), 1:20 | Nov 28, 2025 | Querétaro, Mexico | |
| 19 | Win | 17–1–1 | Adrien Broner | UD | 10 | Jun 7, 2024 | Hard Rock Hotel & Casino, Hollywood, Florida, U.S. | |
| 18 | Win | 16–1–1 | Maurice Hooker | UD | 10 | Aug 6, 2022 | Dickies Arena, Fort Worth, Texas, U.S. | |
| 17 | Loss | 15–1–1 | Alexis Rocha | KO | 9 (10), 0:44 | Mar 19, 2022 | Galen Center, Los Angeles, California, U.S. | |
| 16 | Win | 15–0–1 | Brad Solomon | TKO | 5 (10), 2:57 | Jun 19, 2021 | Don Haskins Center, El Paso, Texas, U.S. | |
| 15 | Win | 14–0–1 | Samuel Kotey Neequaye | SD | 10 | Feb 14, 2020 | Honda Center, Anaheim, California, U.S. | Retained WBC-NABF welterweight title |
| 14 | Win | 13–0–1 | Carlos Ortiz | RTD | 6 (10), 3:00 | Nov 2, 2019 | MGM Grand Garden Arena, Paradise, Nevada, U.S. | Won vacant WBC-NABF welterweight title |
| 13 | Win | 12–0–1 | Steve Villalobos | KO | 9 (10), 1:20 | Aug 22, 2019 | Fantasy Springs Resort Casino, Indio, California, U.S. | Retained WBC-NABF Junior welterweight title |
| 12 | Win | 11–0–1 | Robert Redmond Jr. | KO | 6 (8), 1:52 | Jun 21, 2019 | Fantasy Springs Resort Casino, Indio, California, U.S. | |
| 11 | Win | 10–0–1 | Ferdinand Kerobyan | UD | 8 | Mar 21, 2019 | The Avalon, Los Angeles, California, U.S. | Won vacant WBC-NABF Junior welterweight title |
| 10 | Win | 9–0–1 | Emmanuel Valadez | TKO | 2 (6), 1:52 | Jul 21, 2018 | Hard Rock Hotel and Casino, Paradise, Nevada, U.S. | |
| 9 | Win | 8–0–1 | Juan Rivera | UD | 4 | Jul 6, 2018 | Belasco Theater, Los Angeles, California, U.S. | |
| 8 | Draw | 7–0–1 | Mario Esparza | TD | 4 (4), 0:19 | Mar 16, 2018 | Belasco Theater, Los Angeles, California, U.S. | Fight stopped after Esparza was cut from accidental head clash |
| 7 | Win | 7–0 | Hugo Padilla | UD | 6 | Oct 14, 2017 | Auditorio Miguel Ángel Barbarena Vega, Jesús María, Mexico | |
| 6 | Win | 6–0 | Allan Moore | KO | 2 (4), 0:54 | Jun 24, 2017 | Fitz Casino, Southaven, Mississippi, U.S. | |
| 5 | Win | 5–0 | Alejandro Martinez | TKO | 2 (4), 1:45 | May 18, 2017 | Escape Bar, Tijuana, Mexico | |
| 4 | Win | 4–0 | Julio Sanchez | UD | 4 | Nov 25, 2014 | 2300 Arena, Philadelphia, Pennsylvania, U.S. | |
| 3 | Win | 3–0 | Tevin Reynolds | TKO | 3 (4), 3:00 | Nov 1, 2013 | Lera's Baile Mexicano, Ruffin, North Carolina, U.S. | |
| 2 | Win | 2–0 | Tyshae Ferguson | TKO | 1 (4), 2:35 | Oct 12, 2013 | The Electric Factory, Philadelphia, Pennsylvania, U.S. | |
| 1 | Win | 1–0 | Martique Holland | KO | 1 (4), 0:34 | Jun 28, 2013 | Lera's Baile Mexicano, Ruffin, North Carolina, U.S. | |

Sporting positions
Regional boxing titles
| Vacant Title last held by Marquis Taylor | WBC-NABF Junior welterweight champion March 21 – November 2, 2019; Won full title | Vacant Title next held by Jose Luis Sanchez |
| Vacant Title last held by Egidijus Kavaliauskas | WBC-NABF welterweight champion November 2, 2019 – present | Incumbent |
