= Giovani Santillan =

American boxer (born 1991)

Personal information
- Nickname: Gallo de Oro
- Born: 4 December 1991 (age 34) San Diego, California, U.S.
- Height: 1.73 m (5 ft 8 in)
- Weight: Light welterweight Welterweight

Boxing career
- Reach: 174 cm (69 in)
- Stance: Southpaw

Boxing record
- Total fights: 37
- Wins: 35
- Win by KO: 18
- Losses: 2
Medal record
Representing United States
Men's Amateur boxing
California State Silver Gloves Junior division
Gold medal – first place	2004 Long Beach	Flyweight 12/13 years olds
National Silver Gloves Junior division
Silver medal – second place	2005 Missouri	12/13 years olds

Giovani Santillan (born 3 December 1991) is an American professional boxer who has been competing in the sport since 2012.

== Early life ==
Santillan was born in San Diego, California to parents from Mexico.

== Amateur career ==
As an amateur, Santillan won the 2004 California State Silver Gloves on Junior division (12–13 years olds) and fought in the finals of the 2005 Junior Division National Silver Gloves.

== Professional career ==
Santillan beat Imarjoe Miller via Unanimous decision in his debut match.

Santillan won the NABO welterweight title against Sammy Valentin and throughout 2017 and 2018, Santillan successfully defended the title two times.

Santillan regained the NABO title back in October 2023 after defeating rising star, Alexis Rocha via 6th-round knockout at Kia Forum and makes Rocha taste his first knockout loss.

Santillan faced Brian Norman Jr. for the vacant WBO interim welterweight title on May 18, 2024 at Pechanga Arena in San Diego, California. He lost the bout by knockout in the tenth round with uppercut.

Santillan was scheduled to face Fredrick Lawson in a 10-round welterweight bout at the Footprint Center in Phoenix, Arizona, on December 7, 2024. He won when his opponent retired at the end of the first round.

On 11 September 2026, Santillan lost to Abass Baraou via majority decision at Frontwave Arena in Oceanside, California, in a fight for the vacant WBO Inter-Continental light-middleweight title.

== Professional boxing record ==
37 fights	35 wins	2 losses
By knockout	18	1
By decision	17	1

No.	Result	Record	Opponent	Type	Round, Time	Date	Location	Notes
37	Loss	35–2	Abass Baraou	MD	10	11 Sep 2026	Frontwave Arena, Oceanside, California, U.S.	For vacant WBO Inter-Continental light middleweight title
36	Win	35–1	Courtney Pennington	UD	10	31 Jan 2026	José Miguel Agrelot Coliseum, San Juan, Puerto Rico	
35	Win	34–1	Ángel Beltrán	UD	10	10 May 2025	Pechanga Arena, San Diego, California, U.S.	
34	Win	33–1	Fredrick Lawson	RTD	1 (10), 3:00	7 Dec 2024	Footprint Center, Phoenix, Arizona, U.S.	
33	Loss	32–1	Brian Norman Jr.	KO	10 (12), 1:33	18 May 2024	Pechanga Arena, San Diego, California, U.S.	For vacant WBO interim welterweight title
32	Win	32–0	Alexis Rocha	KO	6 (12), 1:13	21 Oct 2023	Kia Forum, Inglewood, California, U.S.	Won WBO-NABO welterweight title
31	Win	31–0	Erick Bone	UD	10	22 Jul 2023	Firelake Arena, Shawnee, Oklahoma, U.S.	
30	Win	30–0	Julio Luna Avila	UD	10	20 Aug 2022	Pechanga Arena, San Diego, California U.S.	
29	Win	29–0	Jeovanis Barraza	KO	7 (10), 0:33	9 Apr 2022	The Hangar, Costa Mesa, California, U.S.	
28	Win	28–0	Angel Ruiz Astorga	UD	8	15 Oct 2021	Pechanga Arena, San Diego, California U.S.	
27	Win	27–0	Cecil McCalla	UD	8	26 Jun 2021	Virgin Hotels Las Vegas, Las Vegas, Vegas U.S.	
26	Win	26–0	Antonio DeMarco	MD	10	16 Jun 2020	MGM Grand, Paradise, Nevada, U.S.	
25	Win	25–0	Wilfrido Buelvas	KO	2 (8), 2:31	22 Nov 2019	DoubleTree Hotel, Ontario, California, U.S.	
24	Win	24–0	Alejandro Barboza	KO	2 (10), 2:33	27 Apr 2018	DoubleTree Hotel, Ontario, California, U.S.	Retained WBO-NABO welterweight title
23	Win	23–0	Dodzi Kemeh	RTD	4 (10), 3:00	17 Nov 2017	DoubleTree Hotel, Ontario, California, U.S.	Retained WBO-NABO welterweight title
22	Win	22–0	Sammy Valentin	TKO	2 (10), 2:11	7 Jul, 2017	A La Carte Event Pavilion, Tampa, Florida, U.S.	Won WBO-NABO welterweight title
21	Win	21–0	Omar Tienda Bahena	UD	8	10 Feb 2017	DoubleTree Hotel, Ontario, California, U.S.	
20	Win	20–0	Miguel Angel Mendoza	TKO	4 (8), 1:26	18 Nov 2016	DoubleTree Hotel, Ontario, California, U.S.	
19	Win	19–0	Jose de Jesus Macias	UD	8	22 Apr 2016	DoubleTree Hotel, Ontario, California, U.S.	
18	Win	18–0	Rosbel Montoya	TKO	2 (8), 1:04	20 Nov 2015	DoubleTree Hotel, Ontario, California, U.S.	
17	Win	17–0	Ernesto Ortiz Centeno	MD	8	25 Sep 2015	DoubleTree Hotel, Ontario, California, U.S.	
16	Win	16–0	Eduardo Rivera	TKO	1 (8), 2:28	20 Feb 2015	DoubleTree Hotel, Ontario, California, U.S.	
15	Win	15–0	Luis Solis	UD	8	24 Oct 2014	DoubleTree Hotel, Ontario, California, U.S.	Retained WBC-NABF Junior light welterweight title
14	Win	14–0	Osenohan Vazquez	TKO	5 (8), 2:57	16 Aug 2014	Harley Davidson San Diego, San Diego, California, U.S.	Won vacant WBC-NABF Junior light welterweight title
13	Win	13–0	Joaquin Chaves	UD	8	27 Jun 2014	DoubleTree Hotel, Ontario, California, U.S.	
12	Win	12–0	Daniyar Hanyk	UD	8	25 Apr 2014	DoubleTree Hotel, Ontario, California, U.S.	
11	Win	11–0	Michael Balasi	TKO	2 (8), 2:41	22 Nov 2013	DoubleTree Hotel, Ontario, California, U.S.	
10	Win	10–0	Martin Angel Martinez Perez	TKO	4 (8), 1:16	27 Sep 2013	DoubleTree Hotel, Ontario, California, U.S.	
9	Win	9–0	Adam Ealoms	UD	6	28 Jun 2013	DoubleTree Hotel, Ontario, California, U.S.	
8	Win	8–0	Jesus Mendez	UD	6	17 May 2013	DoubleTree Hotel, Ontario, California, U.S.	
7	Win	7–0	Yair Aguiar	KO	2 (6) 2:20	26 Apr 2013	DoubleTree Hotel, Ontario, California, U.S.	
6	Win	6–0	Peter Haro	KO	3 (6), 0:47	9 Nov 12	Urban Arena, Costa Mesa, California, U.S.	
5	Win	5–0	Juan Zuniga	TKO	2 (4), 2:57	29 Sep 2012	Fantasy Springs Casino, Indio, California, U.S.	
4	Win	4–0	Joaquin Chavez	UD	4	4 Aug 2012	Texas Station Casino, Las Vegas, Nevada, U.S.	
3	Win	3–0	Alberto Espinoza	TKO	1 (4), 0:58	20 Jul 2012	DoubleTree Hotel, Ontario, California, U.S.	
2	Win	2–0	Ronald Rodriguez	TKO	1 (4), 1:31	7 Jun 2012	Orange County Fairgrounds, Costa Mesa, California, U.S.	
1	Win	1–0	Imarjoe Miller	UD	4	11 May 2012	Pechanga Resort & Casino, Temecula, California, U.S.	

Regional boxing titles
Vacant Title last held by Taras Shelestyuk	NABO welterweight champion July 7, 2017 – May 2019; Vacated	Vacant Title next held by Mikael Zewski
Preceded by Alexis Rocha	NABO welterweight champion October 21, 2023 – May 18, 2024; Lost bid for interim world title	Vacant
