= Brian Norman Jr. =

American boxer (born 2000)

Personal information
- Nickname: The Assassin II
- Born: November 23, 2000 (age 25) Decatur, Georgia, U.S.
- Height: 5 ft 8 in (173 cm)
- Weight: Welterweight

Boxing career
- Reach: 72 in (183 cm)
- Stance: Orthodox

Boxing record
- Total fights: 32
- Wins: 29
- Win by KO: 23
- Losses: 1
- No contests: 2

Brian Norman Jr. (born November 23, 2000) is an American professional boxer, who held the World Boxing Organization (WBO) welterweight title from 2024 to 2025.

== Early life ==
Norman was born in Decatur, Georgia on November 23, 2000. He began training boxing as his father, Brian Norman Sr. is a long time boxing enthusiast and professional boxer.

== Professional career ==
=== Early career ===
Norman made his debut at the age of 17, in Houston, Texas, stopping Kire Lucas. His next 12 bouts all took place in Mexico. All but two ended inside the distance, with one going the 4-round distance and the other ended in a no contest in round 1. In September 2018, Norman delivered a powerful body shot to Dario Medina, stunning him within the first minute of their fight. The fight took place under Now Boxing Promotions. He was scheduled to make his debut on a ShoBox: The New Generation card on March 13, 2020 at the Grand Casino Hinckley in Hinckley, Minnesota. Norman fought Flavio Rodriguez (9-1-1, 7 KOs) in an 8-round welterweight bout. The card was primarily promoted by Salita Promotions. Norman secured victory through a technical unanimous decision after Rodriguez sustained a cut in the early stages of the seventh round, rendering him unable to continue. After seven completed rounds, the judges scored the fight 68–65, 68–85 and 69–64 for Norman. Fans were barred from attending the event as a precautionary measure to mitigate the spread of the coronavirus. On October 17, Norman faced off against Juan Rodriguez, achieving a knockout in the first round at the Manual Airtime Community Center Theatre in Miami, Florida. With the win, Norman improved to 18-0 1 NC, 15 knockouts. On March 10, 2021, Norman appeared on a non-televised undercard at the Mohegan Sun Arena in Uncasville, Connecticut. He won following a fifth-round knockout of Benjamin Whitaker (15-5, 3 KOs). The stoppage occurred at 1:56 of the fifth round. Norman was due to fight gatekeeper Todd Manuel on April 10, 2021 at the Buckhead Fight Club in Norman's hometown of Atlanta, Georgia. On the day prior to the fight, Augustine Maurus replaced Manuel, who withdrew without providing a reason. Norman won by TKO in the fourth round. His next win came on August 14 at World Congress Center in Atlanta. Norman knocked Demian Fernandez down twice before the fight was halted in the first round.

==== Signing with Top Rank ====
In December 2022, Norman signed with Top Rank. His first fight under Top Rank was scheduled for January 14, at the Turning Stone Resort & Casino in Verona, New York against Rodrigo Damian Coria (10-4, 2 KOs). Norman came close to securing a knockout within the first 30 seconds of the fight, but he was unable to finish the fight. The bout extended the full eight rounds, culminating in a unanimous decision victory for Norman. The judges' scorecards reflected scores of 79–72, 77–74, and 77–74 in favor of Norman. The fight marked the fourth occasion in which Norman had gone to a decision in his career. He went the 8-round distance again on May 13 at the Stockton Arena in Stockton, California against Jesus Antonio Perez. Norman won with scores of 77–75, 77–75 and 78–74.

Norman fought Quinton Randall on the Shakur Stevenson-Edwin De Los Santos undercard, for the vacant WBO international welterweight title on November 16, 2023 at T-Mobile Arena in Las Vegas, Nevada. The 10-round bout was described as more wrestling than boxing. All three judges awarded the win to Norman, who displayed a more aggressive style throughout the fight. Norman's performance, while effective, did not leave a strong impression despite maintaining his unbeaten record. Randall was noted for initiating numerous clinches during the match as Norman pressed forward. Two judges scored the bout 99-91 and the third had it 97-93.

In his first title defense of the international title, Norman faced Janelson Bocachica at Turning Stone Resort Casino in Verona, New York on March 2, 2024. The bout ended in a no contest after both boxers sustained cuts to their foreheads before the fourth round. Norman started the fight tense, leading to an early knockdown from an overhand right in the first round. Despite the knockdown, Norman managed to cut Bocachica over his left eye during the same round. In the second round, Norman suffered a cut over his right eye, while Bocachica was cut on his forehead due to a head clash. The fight became chaotic, with both fighters bleeding and throwing heavy punches without proper setup. Bocachica capitalized on Norman's struggle with range, effectively timing his shots. After three rounds, Bocachica's corner made the decision to withdraw from the fight, which would have proceeded to the scorecards if it had continued.

=== WBO welterweight champion ===
==== Norman vs. Santillan ====
On April 4, 2024 it was announced that Norman would fight WBO No. 1-ranked fighter Giovani Santillan (32-0, 17 KOs) on May 18, at Pechanga Arena in San Diego, California. The fight was scheduled as a co-feature on the Emanuel Navarrete vs. Denys Berinchyk card. Santillan was coming off a stoppage victory against Alexis Rocha and had regained the WBO-NABO title in October 2023. Norman entered as the underdog (+350 odds) facing hometown favorite Santillan. The interim WBO welterweight belt was at stake due to the primary champion, Terence Crawford, was planning to move up to challenge Israil Madrimov on August 3, 2024. Norman was ranked No. 10 with the WBO. During the build-up, Santillan aimed for a decisive victory, either by knockout or clear decision, to solidify his claim for a world title shot. Norman aimed to make a significant impact and recognized Santillan's prior performance. He was resolved to assert his dominance in their matchup.

Norman won via knockout in round 10, claiming the interim WBO welterweight title, shocking Santillan's local supporters. Norman was ahead on all judges’ cards at the time of stoppage and demonstrated resilience to overcome Santillan's early dominance. The fight started competitively with both fighters exchanging blows. Norman showcased strong counter-punching skills, landing significant uppercuts. In the opening rounds, Santillan seemed to apply pressure, but Norman effectively countered. By the end of the eighth round, Norman delivered a strong uppercut that resulted in significant bleeding from Santillan's nose, which adversely impacted his performance in the subsequent rounds. Although Santillan endeavored to respond, he seemed to be at a disadvantage as the fight continued. In the tenth round, Norman executed a right-left combination that sent Santillan to the floor. After he regained his footing, Santillan was struck again and fell to the canvas, leading the referee to halt the contest at 1:33 of the round, declaring Norman the winner by knockout. Norman sustained a hand injury from the decisive knockout punch in the fight, which required surgery and delayed his next bout. According to CompuBox, over the ten rounds, Santillan landed 113 of his 396 punches thrown (28.5%) and Norman landed157 of his 555 thrown (28.3%). In the post-fight, Norman expressed his interest in facing Terence Crawford, who was anticipated to vacate his title. Initially, Norman aimed at Mario Barrios, another recent interim title winner, but promptly redirected his attention to Conor Benn, specifying his intention to secure a decisive victory over Benn before revisiting a match with Barrios.

On August 12, 2024, Terence Crawford vacated the WBO welterweight title to remain at junior middleweight and Norman was promoted to full champion.

==== Norman vs. Cuevas ====
On August 30, 2024, it was revealed that talks for a fight between Norman and Jaron Ennis ended due to financial disagreements. It was announced that Norman would instead fight #7 ranked Derrieck Cuevas (27–1–1, 19 KO) on November 8 on the Keyshawn Davis vs. Gustavo Lemos card on ESPN. Cuevas was viewed as a less credible threat to Norman based on recent performances. The fight was confirmed a week later, taking place at the Scope Arena in Norfolk, Virginia. On October 1, Norman sustained an injury to his left hand, resulting in the cancellation of his fight with Cuevas. He intended to reschedule the fight for the first quarter of 2025. Carl Moretti later confirming the fight would be scheduled for March 2025. The fight was rescheduled to March 29, at the Fontainebleau in Las Vegas.

During the lead-up to the event, Norman underscored the importance of title defense for a champion to be regarded as such. Cuevas had been inactive for 15 months and had never faced an opponent of Norman's caliber. Having experienced his only career loss in 2020, Cuevas had since recorded four consecutive stoppages. He perceived Norman's remarks and his continued emphasis on Ennis as disrespectful, viewing them as an effort to diminish his standing. Cuevas disputed Norman's claim to the WBO welterweight title, contending that Norman was not the authentic champion. Cuevas expressed doubt regarding Norman's status, indicating that the title was awarded rather than earned through competition against a legitimate champion. This exchange heightened the tension leading up to their forthcoming fight. Norman appeared surprised by Cuevas's remarks but countered by questioning whether a victory over him would establish Cuevas as a champion. Cuevas upheld his position, asserting that Norman's title resulted from his elevation from interim status in 2024, rather than through a bout against a recognized champion.

In the highly anticipated fight, Norman secured a technical knockout against Cuevas in the third round, successfully defending his WBO welterweight title. Norman approached the fight with caution, initially enduring some early strikes from Cuevas, who was recognized for his punching power. Both engaged in exchanging strong punches, resulting in a competitive opening round. By the second round, Norman established his rhythm, delivering impactful left hooks that notably troubled Cuevas. The momentum began to shift in favor of Norman as his connections became more frequent. The bout concluded in the third round when Norman landed a left hook that knocked Cuevas to the canvas. Although Cuevas was able to rise, he did not adequately respond to the referee's commands, prompting the referee to stop the fight at 2:59 of the round. Post-fight, Norman expressed his desire to pursue further title opportunities, particularly the winner of Jaron Ennis-Eimantas Stanionis, and solidify his status among the top fighters. Over the three rounds, Norman landed 30 of 91 punches thrown (33%) and Cuevas landed 19 of 77 punches (24.7%).

==== Norman vs. Sasaki ====
Japanese boxer Jin Sasaki (19–1–1, 13 KOs) travelled to Las Vegas to watch Norman defeat Cuevas and offer Norman a fight, which he accepted, indicating mutual interest in a potential matchup. Norman was open to fighting abroad if there was demand in the marketplace, much to Sasaki's pleasure. Eddie Hearn was seeking to organize a fight between Ennis and Norman in light of Ennis's victory over Eimantas Stanionis. He has reinitiated discussions about this matchup after prior attempts were unsuccessful, engaging with Bob Arum, who has shown interest in facilitating the fight. On April 25, Top Rank announced that Norman would make his second defence in Tokyo at the Ota City General Gymnasium against Sasaki on June 19. At the time, Norman was the youngest male world champion. The fight was streamed live on ESPN+ in the United States. Arum praised Norman as a motivated champion who embraced the challenge. The matchup was expected to be an exciting and action-packed contest due to the fighters' contrasting styles. Norman was to receive a career-high purse. Norman experienced an increase in his fan base leading up to the fight. Following the announcement of the match, he observed a notable rise in his Japanese followers, indicating growing interest in his career. He conveyed enthusiasm about competing in Sasaki's hometown of Tokyo, highlighting his intention to create a lasting impact and inspire further support from fans after the event. Conversely, Sasaki was driven by the ambition to become the first Japanese boxer to secure a welterweight world title. Both weighed 146.8 pounds.

Norman successfully defended his WBO title with a devastating fifth-round knockout of Sasaki. Norman registered two knockdowns in the first round, demonstrating his effectiveness with a counter left hook that caused Sasaki to fall to the canvas just 40 seconds into the fight. Although Sasaki managed to recover, he was swiftly knocked down again following a series of punches. As the rounds continued, Norman sustained his dominance. He landed impactful punches that left Sasaki struggling to respond effectively. In the fifth round, Norman executed a decisive left hook that resulted in Sasaki being rendered unconscious. The bout was halted immediately, with Sasaki remaining motionless on the canvas. He was subsequently assisted from the ring and transported to the hospital for precautionary evaluation. After the fight, Norman told reporters, “That was a very fun fight. Jin Sasaki came to fight. I got nothing but respect for him. I can't wait to come back here.” Sasaki was later reported to be in stable condition, although it was said that he had no recollection of the fight nor the six weeks leading up to it. Acclaimed sportswriter Dan Rafael awarded Norman with the 2025 Fight Freaks Unite knockout of the year.

==== Norman vs Haney ====
In June 2025 it was announced that Norman would face Devin Haney (32–0, 15 KOs, 1 NC) in November 2025 in a title defense that would be a headliner for a show in Saudi Arabia for Riyadh Season. Tuki Alalshikh announced the fight would headline a super card in Riyadh. The card, billed as "Ring IV" was formally announced to take place on November 22, 2025. Norman expressed no surprise at Haney's selection of him as an opponent. He commended Haney's determination and resilience, noting that he never shied away from a challenge. Norman believed he would achieve a stoppage win, but he thought his ring IQ, technical skills, and other attributes were not fully appreciated. He was prepared to display his abilities on a significant platform. A confrontation occurred on July 12 in New York, involving Haney's security guard, referred to as Big Tank. During the incident, Big Tank perceived Norman to be too close to Haney and grabbed his shirt, resulting in a rip. Norman then executed a hip toss on Big Tank using one arm. Video footage of the incident later circulated on social media. Haney expressed that he was not worried about Norman's recent series of stoppage victories. He indicated that Norman had not competed against opponents of the same caliber as those he had faced. On August 20, Norman formalized a multi-year contract extension with Top Rank. There were rumors initiated by Norman Sr.'s former opponent, Greg Hackett, suggesting that Norman Jr. was experiencing overtraining. Norman Sr. rejected these claims, stating that Greg was not involved with the camp and that such rumors stem from individuals looking for reasons for Norman Jr.'s potential shortcomings. He also noted criticisms being made about Norman Jr., including allegations of fatigue after the sixth round and having limited agility. Brian Norman and Bill Haney had an intense verbal confrontation during the last press conference. During the face off, Norman appeared calm and composed, while Haney displayed a more animated demeanor. Norman weighed 146 pounds and Haney came in at 146.6 pounds.

Fighting at the anb Arena in Riyadh, Norman lost to Haney via unanimous decision, ending his championship reign. From the first round on, Haney came out more aggressively than expected, forcing Norman on the back foot. Midway through the second round, Haney stunned Norman with a check left hook, which he followed with a right cross that dropped Norman and severely damaged his nose. Haney maintained this aggressive pace for the next several rounds, with a tentative Norman struggling to close the distance and land anything meaningful. The second half of the fight saw Norman finding more success as Haney took his foot off of the gas, but the last two rounds saw Haney retake control as a badly fatigued Norman started to smother his own shots. In the end, Norman lost by scores of 114-113, 117-110, and 116-111. This was the first loss of his career. CompuBox showed that Haney landed 70 of 271 punches thrown (26%) and Norman landed only 59 of his 399 (15%).

=== Post-title career ===
Two months following the loss, Norman Sr. was dropped as head trainer, but remained in his team in another capacity. Norman described the decision as a professional move to “shake things up” and explore other options. He was looking to fight again by April 2026, under Top Rank. On February 14, it was reported that he would make his ring return, under a new trainer in May. Although a new trainer was not announced, Norman had been working with Derrick James and Ronnie Shields. On April 15, Top Rank announced that Norman would be returning to action on their DAZN debut on the Keyshawn Davis vs. Nahir Albright undercard at Scope Arena, Norfolk, Virginia, on May 16. He was scheduled for a 10-round bout against Josh Wagner (19-2, 10 KOs), making his debut with new coach Ronnie Shields. Wagner had one win in his last three fights; however, he had stepped up in competition. Heading into the Norman bout, he felt overlooked and underestimated. He promised an aggressive performance rather than fighting defensively. During the fight, Norman knocked Wagner to the canvas twice in the second round. After the second knockdown, Wagner indicated he had a problem with his left shoulder and, following consultation with the ringside doctor, the bout was halted and Norman was awarded the win via technical knockout.

On October 29, 2026, The Ring reported that Norman would fight veteran contender Abel Ramos (29–6–3, 22 KOs) on December 19, in San Francisco at the Chase Center. The bout was scheduled for the undercard of the welterweight unification fight between Devin Haney and Liam Paro. Norman was looking to re-establish himself in the title picture, while Ramos was entering the fight after consecutive notable performances, including an upset victory over unbeaten prospect Tahmir Smalls and a split draw against former WBC champion Mario Barrios. On November 5, the fight was officially announced and was scheduled to be broadcast on DAZN with Top Rank co-promoting the event.

== Throwback Boxing Promotions ==
In March 2026, Norman launched his own promotional company, founding Throwback Boxing Promotions, where he would serve as the CEO. Jolene Mizzone was appointed the president of the company. He announced their first signing, southpaw, former world title challenger Edwin De Los Santos, who would be co-promoted by Zuffa Boxing. Norman spoke at a press release, explaining why the name was important. He said, “There are a lot of old school fighters that lost to the business of boxing and couldn’t get an opportunity to show their talents. We will be the ones that give those hidden gems their opportunity to shine. We are doing this for you.”

== Professional boxing record ==
32 fights	29 wins	1 loss
By knockout	23	0
By decision	6	1
No contests	2	

No.	Result	Record	Opponent	Type	Round, time	Date	Location	Notes
32	Win	29–1 (2)	Josh Wagner	TKO	2 (10) 1:24	May 16, 2026	Scope Arena, Norfolk, Virginia, U.S.	
31	Loss	28–1 (2)	Devin Haney	UD	12	Nov 22, 2025	anb Arena, Riyadh, Saudi Arabia	Lost WBO welterweight title
30	Win	28–0 (2)	Jin Sasaki	KO	5 (12) 0:46	Jun 19, 2025	Ota City General Gymnasium, Tokyo, Japan	Retained WBO welterweight title
29	Win	27–0 (2)	Derrieck Cuevas	TKO	3 (12) 2:59	Mar 29, 2025	Fontainebleau Las Vegas, Winchester, Nevada, U.S.	Retained WBO welterweight title
28	Win	26–0 (2)	Giovani Santillan	KO	10 (12), 1:33	May 18, 2024	Pechanga Arena, San Diego, California, U.S.	Won vacant WBO interim welterweight title
27	NC	25–0 (2)	Janelson Figueroa Bocachica	NC	3 (10), 3:00	Mar 2, 2024	Turning Stone Resort Casino, Verona, New York, U.S.	Retained WBO International welterweight title; Fight stopped after Bocahica suffered a cut from an accidental head clash
26	Win	25–0 (1)	Quinton Randall	UD	10	Nov 16, 2023	T-Mobile Arena, Paradise, Nevada, U.S.	Won vacant WBO International welterweight title
25	Win	24–0 (1)	Jesus Antonio Perez Campos	UD	8	May 13, 2023	Stockton Arena, Stockton, California, U.S.	
24	Win	23–0 (1)	Rodrigo Damian Coria	UD	8	Jan 14, 2023	Turning Stone Resort Casino, Verona, New York, U.S.	
23	Win	22–0 (1)	Roque Agustin Junco	TKO	1 (6), 2:12	Dec 11, 2021	Buckhead Fight Club, Atlanta, Georgia, U.S.	
22	Win	21–0 (1)	Demian Daniel Fernandez	TKO	1 (8), 1:31	Aug 14, 2021	Georgia World Congress Center, Atlanta, Georgia, U.S.	
21	Win	20–0 (1)	Agustine Mauras	TKO	4 (8), 1:47	Apr 10, 2021	Buckhead Fight Club, Atlanta, Georgia, U.S.	
20	Win	19–0 (1)	Benjamin Whitaker	TKO	5 (8), 1:56	Mar 10, 2021	Mohegan Sun Arena, Uncasville, Connecticut, U.S.	
19	Win	18–0 (1)	Juan Rodriguez Jr	KO	1 (8), 1:26	Oct 17, 2020	Manual Artime Community Center Theater, Miami, Florida, U.S.	
18	Win	17–0 (1)	Flavio Rodriguez	TD	7 (8), 0:57	Mar 13, 2020	Grand Casino Hinckley, Hinckley, Minnesota, U.S.	
17	Win	16–0 (1)	Evincii Dixon	UD	6	Jan 17, 2020	WinnaVegas Casino & Resort, Sloan, Iowa, U.S.	
16	Win	15–0 (1)	Kevin Womack Jr	KO	1 (6), 0:38	Jul 27, 2019	Georgia World Congress Center, Atlanta, Georgia, U.S.	
15	Win	14–0 (1)	Justino Rivera Meza	TKO	1 (4), 2:02	Jun 29, 2019	Bosque de la Ciudad, San Luis Río Colorado, Mexico	
14	Win	13–0 (1)	Angelo Snow	KO	6 (6), 0:25	May 4, 2019	Horizons Event Hall, Norcross, Georgia, U.S.	
13	NC	12–0 (1)	Carlos Ramirez	NC	1 (6), 2:51	Apr 27, 2019	Auditorio del Estado, Mexicali, Mexico	
12	Win	12–0	Jorge Babuca Watanabe	TKO	1 (4), 0:34	Jan 26, 2019	Auditorio del Estado, Mexicali, Mexico	
11	Win	11–0	Jesus Soto Gonzalez	KO	1 (4), 0:28	Dec 7, 2018	Esquina Food Truck, Mexicali, Mexico	
10	Win	10–0	Miguel Robinson Salmeron	TKO	1 (4), 2:48	Oct 27, 2018	Gimnasio de Mexicali, Mexicali, Mexico	
9	Win	9–0	Dario Medina Talavera	KO	1 (4), 0:55	Aug 31, 2018	Parque Vicente Guerrero, Mexicali, Mexico	
8	Win	8–0	Zeus Valenzuela	UD	4	Aug 11, 2018	Gimnasio de Mexicali, Mexicali, Mexico	
7	Win	7–0	Luis Cueto Hernandez	KO	2 (4), 2:28	Jul 21, 2018	Bosque de la Ciudad, San Luis Río Colorado, Mexico	
6	Win	6–0	Alejandro Almada Franco	TKO	3 (4), 1:57	Jun 30, 2018	Gimnasio de Mexicali, Mexicali, Mexico	
5	Win	5–0	Odilon Rivera Meza	TKO	1 (4), 0:25	May 26, 2018	Mexicali, Mexico	
4	Win	4–0	Carlos Bacasegua Luzania	RTD	2 (4), 3:00	Apr 14, 2018	Gimnasio de Box, Los Algodones, Mexico	
3	Win	3–0	Jose Luis Leal	TKO	1 (4), 1:29	Mar 24, 2018	Terraza del Sol del Parque Vicente Guerrero, Mexicali, Mexico	
2	Win	2–0	Luis Romero	KO	1 (4), 0:27	Feb 23, 2018	Gimnasio de Mexicali, Mexicali, Mexico	
1	Win	1–0	Kire Lucas	TKO	1 (4), 1:31	Jan 20, 2018	Arabia Shrine Center, Houston, Texas, U.S.	

== See also ==
- List of world welterweight boxing champions

Sporting positions
Regional boxing titles
Vacant Title last held by Vergil Ortiz Jr.	WBO International welterweight champion November 16, 2023 – May 18, 2024; Won interim title	Vacant
World boxing titles
Vacant Title last held by Timothy Bradley	WBO welterweight champion Interim title May 18, 2024 – August 12, 2024; Promoted	Vacant Title next held by Karen Chukhadzhian
Vacant Title last held by Terence Crawford	WBO welterweight champion August 12, 2024 – November 22, 2025	Succeeded by Devin Haney
