= Jhon Orobio =

Colombian boxer (born 2003)

Personal information
- Nickname: El Tigre
- Nationality: Colombian
- Born: Jhon Elin Orobio Siniestra; 21 June 2003 (age 23) Cali, Colombia
- Weight: Super Lightweight

Boxing career
- Stance: Orthodox

Boxing record
- Total fights: 20
- Wins: 20
- Win by KO: 18

Jhon Orobio (born 21 June 2003) is a Colombian professional boxer who currently competes in the super-lightweight division.

== Amateur career ==
As an amateur Orobio represented the Colombia national team as well as competing at the Pan American championship and the Junior World Championships where he picked up a bronze medal

== Professional career ==
After winning the first seven fights of his career, Orobio was forced to go the distance for the first time against Alexis Gabriel Camejo. Orobio won all rounds on the scorecards Orobio was forced to go the distance for the second time in his career by durable Argentine Sebastian Ezequiel Aguirre. Despite this Orobio dominated the fight and won every round on the judges scorecards Orobio is currently scheduled to face Slovakian Zsolt Ordan on June 27 at the Montreal Casino. With the WBC Continental Americas super lightweight title on the line Orobio has the chance to claim the first title of his pro career .

== Professional boxing record ==
20 fights	20 wins	0 losses
By knockout	18	0
By decision	2	0

No.	Result	Record	Opponent	Type	Round, time	Date	Location	Notes
20	Win	20–0	(Dominican Republic) Hendri Cedeno	TKO	3 (10), 1:54	12 Nov 2026	Montreal Casino, Montreal, Canada	Retained WBA and WBC Continental Americas light welterweight titles
19	Win	19–0	(Mexico) Antonio Moran	TKO	4 (10)	3 Sep 2026	Montreal Casino, Montreal, Canada	Retained WBA and WBC Continental Americas light welterweight titles
18	Win	18–0	(United States) Jonathan Montrel	TKO	4 (10), 2:15	4 Jun 2026	Montreal Casino, Montreal, Canada	Retained WBC Continental Americas light welterweight title; Won vacant WBA Continental Americas light welterweight title
17	Win	17–0	(Puerto Rico) Yomar Álamo	KO	5 (10), 0:45	5 Mar 2026	Montreal Casino, Montreal, Canada	Retained WBC Continental Americas light welterweight title
16	Win	16–0	(South Africa) Xolisani Ndongeni	TKO	2 (10), 2:47	13 Nov 2025	Montreal Casino, Montreal, Canada	Retained WBC Continental Americas light welterweight title
15	Win	15–0	(Mexico) Ivan Basurto Monroy	TKO	3 (8), 1:38	4 Sep 2025	Montreal Casino, Montreal, Canada	Retained WBC Continental Americas light welterweight title
14	Win	14–0	(Slovakia) Zsolt Osadan	KO	1 (10), 2:57	27 Jun 2025	Centre Videotron, Quebec City, Quebec, Canada	Won vacant WBC Continental Americas light welterweight title
13	Win	13–0	(Argentina) Sebastian Ezequiel Aguirre	UD	8	10 Apr 2025	Montreal Casino, Montreal, Canada	
12	Win	12–0	(Italy) Jacopo Colli	TKO	1 (8), 1:12	7 Nov 2024	Montreal Casino, Montreal, Canada	
11	Win	11–0	(Argentina) Joel Ivan Manriquez	TKO	2 (8), 2:54	5 Sep 2024	Montreal Casino, Montreal, Canada	
10	Win	10–0	(Mexico) Jose de Leon Jasso	TKO	2 (8), 0:53	6 Jun 2024	Montreal Casino, Montreal, Canada	
9	Win	9–0	(Argentina) Alexis Gabriel Camejo	UD	4	25 May 2024	Centre Gervais Auto, Shawinigan, Canada	
8	Win	8–0	(Chile) Cristian Palma	TKO	2 (6), 2:46	2 May 2024	Montreal Casino, Montreal, Canada	
7	Win	7–0	(Argentina) Cristian Rodrigo Gonzalez	TKO	2 (6), 2:51	7 Mar 2024	Montreal Casino, Montreal, Canada	
6	Win	6–0	(Mexico) Juan Carlos Ramirez Garcia	RTD	2 (6), 3:00	25 Jan 2024	Montreal Casino, Montreal, Canada	
5	Win	5–0	(Mexico) Jesus Solis Reyes	TKO	4 (6), 0:48	11 Oct 2023	Montreal Casino, Montreal, Canada	
4	Win	4–0	(Mexico) Luis Godinez Bautista	TKO	1 (4), 3:00	8 Sep 2023	Lac Leamy Casino, Gatineau, Canada	
3	Win	3–0	(Mexico) Reymundo Gutierrez	TKO	1 (4), 1:33	1 Jun 2023	Montreal Casino, Montreal, Canada	
2	Win	2–0	(Mexico) Leonardo Dominguez Sosa	TKO	2 (4), 1:02	5 May 2023	Cuernavaca, Mexico	
1	Win	1–0	(Mexico) Alejandro Medina de la Rosa	TKO	1 (4) 1:35	23 Mar 2023	Montreal Casino, Montreal, Canada	
