= Richardson Hitchins =

American boxer (born 1997)

Personal information
- Nickname: Africa
- Born: September 26, 1997 (age 29) Brooklyn, New York, U.S.
- Height: 5 ft 10 in (178 cm)
- Weight: Light welterweight

Boxing career
- Reach: 74 in (188 cm)
- Stance: Orthodox

Boxing record
- Total fights: 21
- Wins: 21
- Win by KO: 8
Medal record
Men's amateur boxing
Olympic Qualifying
Silver medal – second place	2016 Baku	Light welterweight
New York Golden Gloves
Gold medal – first place	2016 Brooklyn	Light welterweight
Gold medal – first place	2015 Brooklyn	Light welterweight

Richardson Hitchins (born September 26, 1997) is an American professional boxer, who previously held the International Boxing Federation (IBF) light welterweight title from 2024 to 2026.

== Early life ==
Hitchins was born and raised in Crown Heights, Brooklyn. Brought up by his mother, Jolia Jacques, he spent his summer days assisting her in selling water bottles at a park to help pay bills. A fan of WWE, Hitchins first took an interest in boxing after watching Floyd Mayweather Jr. make an appearance for the wrestling promotion in 2008. He began training at age 12 and credits his childhood gym, Atlas Cops & Kids, for keeping him away from the streets.

== Amateur career ==
As an amateur at the national level, Hitchins won back to back New York Golden Gloves. At the international level, having failed to qualify for the U.S. Olympic team, he decided to represent his parents' country of Haiti instead. Competing at the AIBA World Olympic Qualifying Tournament in Baku, Azerbaijan, he took home the silver medal to qualify for the 2016 Summer Olympics in Rio de Janeiro, where he lost in the opening round to Gary Antuanne Russell.

== Professional career ==
=== Early career ===
Hitchins made his professional debut on March 4, 2017, defeating Mario Perez by TKO in the first round. He compiled a record of 14–0 with six wins by way of knockout (KO), defeating former IBF super featherweight champion Argenis Mendez along the way.

In his first pro fight after signing with Matchroom Boxing, Hitchins fought Yomar Álamo for the vacant IBF North American light welterweight title on November 12, 2022. He won the bout after Álamo's corner decided to call an end to the contest at the conclusion of the eighth round. On February 4, 2023, Hitchins fought John Bauza with the IBF North American and WBC USA light welterweight titles on the line. Hitchins dominated the fight, knocking Bauza down in the first and fourth rounds en route to a unanimous decision victory, with all three judges scoring the fight 100–88.

Looking to add the vacant WBC Silver and NABO light welterweight titles to his collection, Hitchins fought Jose Zepeda on September 23, 2023. He controlled the bout from start to finish, winning by unanimous decision. The three judges scored the bout 120–108, 120–108, and 119–109, all in favor of Hitchins.

On April 6, 2024, in Las Vegas, Hitchins was scheduled to fight Gustavo Daniel Lemos in the IBF super lightweight title eliminator. Hitchins, in a very controversial outcome, defeated Lemos via unanimous decision.

=== IBF Super Lightweight Champion ===
==== Hitchins vs. Paro ====
Hitchins challenged Liam Paro for his IBF super lightweight title on 7 December 2024 in San Juan, Puerto Rico, dethroning the champion by split decision with two ringside judges scoring the fight 116–112 in his favour while the third had it 117-111 for his opponent.

==== Hitchins vs. Kambosos Jr. ====
Hitchins was scheduled to make the first defense of his IBF super lightweight title against George Kambosos Jr. on June 14, 2025, in New York. Hitchins defeated Kambosos Jr. by eighth-round knockout to retain his title.

==== Hitchins vs. Duarte ====
Hitchins was scheduled to make the second defense of his IBF super lightweight title against Oscar Duarte on February 21, 2026, in Las Vegas. On February 25, it was announced that the IBF ordered Hitchins to make a defence of his IBF title against mandatory challenger Lindolfo Delgado (24–0, 16 KOs), who was promoted by Top Rank.

=== Zuffa Boxing ===
On April 8, 2026, it was announced that Hitchins signed with Zuffa Boxing. He later vacated his IBF title, and announced a move to welterweight ahead of his Zuffa debut. Hitchins' said he outgrew 140 pounds, a weight he had fought in since he was 16 years old.

==== Hitchins vs Salas ====
On June 9, 2026, it was announced that Hitchins would fight Ricardo Salas in a 12-round welterweight co-feature bout at Zuffa Boxing 09 at the Infosys Theater at Madison Square Garden in New York on July 26, 2026. His manager Keith Connolly, clarified that Hitchins vacated his IBF junior-welterweight title because he had outgrown the division and not because of Zuffa's stance on the sanctioning bodies. According to Connolly, Hitchins was still looking to pursue the IBF title at welterweight. On the Zuffa contract, he said, “We actually had in his contract that he could keep [his title] and defend it. So, yeah, he will be looking to win titles going forward.” Hitchins dominated Salas over 10 rounds, winning every round on 3 judges scorecards. He used his jab consistently, accurate hooks, and controlled each round. He also landed straight right hands and left hooks consistently following the jab. Salas tried to apply pressure but was unable to find any clean opening due to Hitchins' effective use of shoulder-roll and footwork. Hitchins also clinched when Salas was able to get close. His team encouraged him to go for a knockout, but Hitchins remained disciplined due to a hand injury he picked up during training. The right hand bothered Hitchins from the sixth round. After the fight, Hitchins called out some big names around his weight class such as Gervonta Davis, Ryan Garcia, and Devin Haney. He said, “21-0, no draws, no stains. Come get it if you want it.”

== Personal life ==
Hitchins currently lives and trains in Brooklyn, New York. He has been with longtime trainer Lenny Wilson since he was 15. Hitchins is currently signed with Matchroom Boxing. He was previously signed with Mayweather Promotions, founded by Floyd Mayweather Jr., immediately before turning pro.

Hitchins is of Haitian descent.

== Professional boxing record ==
21 fights	21 wins	0 losses
By knockout	8	0
By decision	13	0

No.	Result	Record	Opponent	Type	Round, time	Date	Location	Notes
21	Win	21–0	Ricardo Salas	UD	10	Jul 26, 2026	The Theater at Madison Square Garden, New York, New York	
20	Win	20–0	George Kambosos Jr	TKO	8 (12), 2:33	Jun 14, 2025	The Theater at Madison Square Garden, New York, New York	Retained IBF light welterweight title
19	Win	19–0	Liam Paro	SD	12	Dec 7, 2024	Roberto Clemente Coliseum, San Juan, Puerto Rico	Won IBF light welterweight title
18	Win	18–0	Gustavo Daniel Lemos	UD	12	Apr 6, 2024	Fontainebleau Las Vegas, Winchester, Nevada, U.S.	
17	Win	17–0	Jose Zepeda	UD	12	Sep 23, 2023	Caribe Royale Orlando, Orlando, Florida, U.S.	Retained IBF North American light welterweight title; Won vacant WBC Silver and NABO light welterweight titles
16	Win	16–0	John Bauza	UD	10	Feb 4, 2023	MSG Theater, New York City, New York, U.S.	Retained IBF North American light welterweight title; Won vacant WBC USA light welterweight title
15	Win	15–0	Yomar Álamo	RTD	8 (10), 3:00	Nov 12, 2022	Rocket Mortgage FieldHouse, Cleveland, Ohio, U.S.	Won vacant IBF North American light welterweight title
14	Win	14–0	Angel Sarinana Rodriguez	TKO	4 (10), 1:48	May 21, 2022	Gila River Arena, Glendale, Arizona, U.S.	
13	Win	13–0	Malik Hawkins	UD	10	Dec 18, 2021	Minneapolis Armory, Minneapolis, Minnesota, U.S.	
12	Win	12–0	Argenis Mendez	SD	10	Dec 12, 2020	Mohegan Sun Arena, Uncasville, Connecticut, U.S.	
11	Win	11–0	Nicholas DeLomba	UD	10	Feb 28, 2020	Sam's Town Hotel, Sunrise Manor, Nevada, U.S.	
10	Win	10–0	Kevin Johnson	UD	10	Nov 1, 2019	Sam's Town Hotel, Sunrise Manor, Nevada, U.S.	
9	Win	9–0	Alejandro Munera	RTD	3 (8), 3:00	May 18, 2019	Barclays Center, New York City, New York, U.S.	
8	Win	8–0	David Morales	RTD	3 (6), 3:00	Mar 2, 2019	Barclays Center, New York City, New York, U.S.	
7	Win	7–0	Tre'Sean Wiggins	UD	8	Jan 17, 2019	MGM Grand Garden Arena, Paradise, Nevada, U.S.	
6	Win	6–0	Cesar Valenzuela	UD	6	Sep 8, 2018	Barclays Center, New York City, New York, U.S.	
5	Win	5–0	Alexander Charneco	KO	1 (6), 1:17	Apr 21, 2018	Barclays Center, New York City, New York, U.S.	
4	Win	4–0	Charles Stanford	TKO	2 (6), 2:15	Mar 3, 2018	Barclays Center, New York City, New York, U.S.	
3	Win	3–0	Jordan Morales	UD	4	Oct 14, 2017	Barclays Center, New York City, New York, U.S.	
2	Win	2–0	Alexander Picot	UD	4	Apr 22, 2017	Barclays Center, New York City, New York, U.S.	
1	Win	1–0	Mario Alberto Perez Navarro	TKO	1 (4), 1:33	Mar 4, 2017	Barclays Center, New York City, New York, U.S.	

== Titles in boxing ==
=== Major world titles ===
- IBF light welterweight champion (140 lbs)

=== Silver world titles ===
- WBC Silver light welterweight champion (140 lbs)

=== Regional/International titles ===
- IBF North American light welterweight champion (140 lbs)
- WBC USA light welterweight champion (140 lbs)
- NABO light welterweight champion (140 lbs)

== Awards ==
=== Boxing Awards ===
- BOXSPORT Knockout of the Week: June 2025
- Ranked #18 on ESPN's Boxing Top 25 Under 25: 2022
- BOXRAW Breakout Star of the Year Nominee: 2022
- BOXRAW Sleeper of the Week: December 2020

=== Honors ===
- Key to Union City: 2025

== See also ==
- List of male boxers
- List of world light-welterweight boxing champions

Sporting positions
Regional boxing titles
Vacant Title last held by Montana Love	IBF North American light welterweight champion November 12, 2022 – December 7, 2024; Won world title	Vacant
Vacant Title last held by Kenneth Sims Jr	WBC USA light welterweight champion February 4, 2023 – 2023; Vacated	Vacant Title next held by Trini Ochoa
Vacant Title last held by Sergey Lipinets	WBC Silver light welterweight champion September 23, 2023 – 2024; Vacated	Vacant Title next held by Dalton Smith
Vacant Title last held by Nestor Bravo	NABO light welterweight champion September 23, 2023 – 2024; Vacated	Vacant Title next held by Alfredo Santiago
World boxing titles
Preceded by Liam Paro	IBF light welterweight champion December 7, 2024 – April 20, 2026; Vacated	Vacant
