= Gustavo Daniel Lemos =

Argentinian boxer

Personal information
- Nickname: El Electrico
- Nationality: Argentinian
- Born: 24 March 1996 (age 30) Tres Arroyos, Argentina
- Height: 5 ft 5.5 in (166 cm)
- Weight: Lightweight; Super-lightweight

Boxing career
- Stance: Orthodox

Boxing record
- Total fights: 31
- Wins: 29
- Win by KO: 19
- Losses: 2

Gustavo Daniel Lemos (born 24 March 1996) is an Argentinian professional boxer.

== Professional boxing career ==
Lemos made his professional debut against Lucio Alberto Ayala on 7 May 2016. He won the fight by unanimous decision. Lemos amassed a 13–0 record during the next two years, before being booked to face Ruben Dario Lopez for the vacant IBF Latino super lightweight belt on 26 January 2018, the first major regional title of his career. He won the fight by a fourth-round knockout. Lemos made his first title defense against Damian Leonardo Yapur on 24 March 2018. He won the fight by a fifth-round knockout. He was deducted a point in both the fourth and fifth rounds for low blows.

Lemos next moved down to lightweight, in order to challenge the IBF Latino lightweight champion Miguel German Acosta on 21 July 2018. He won the fight by a third-round technical knockout. Acosta was knocked down twice before the stoppage, once in the second and once in the third round. Lemos made his first title defense against Nestor Armas on 24 August 2018. He knocked Armas down in the opening round, before knocking him out in the fourth round. Lemos faced Uriel Perez in a non-title bout on 13 October 2018, in his final fight of the year. He won the fight by unanimous decision, with scores of 96–93, 98–91 and 99–90.

Lemos made his second Latino lightweight title defense against Galvis Guerra on 12 January 2019. He won the fight by a fourth-round knockout, after knocking Guerra down twice in the fourth round prior to the knockout. Lemos then faced the experienced Jorge Paez Jr in a non-title bout on 30 March 2019. He won the fight by a second-round knockout. Lemos made his third Latino title defense against Pedro Verdu on 18 May 2019. He won the fight by a fifth-round technical knockout.

Lemos faced Jonathan Jose Eniz for the vacant IBF Youth lightweight title on 23 August 2019. He won the fight by a third-round technical knockout. Lemos made the first defense of his newly acquired title against Yeison Gonzalez on 23 November 2019. He won the fight by a second-round technical knockout.

Lemos returned from a thirteen-month absence from the professional competition to face Jakmani Hurtado for the vacant IBF Latino super lightweight title on 18 December 2020. He won the fight by a second-round technical knockout. Lemos made his first Latino super lightweight title defense against Demian Daniel Fernandez on 20 February 2021. He made quick work of his opponent, as he won by a first-round technical knockout. Lemos made his second title defense against Maximiliano Ricardo Veron on 17 April 2021. He won the fight by an eight-round technical knockout.

Lemos was booked to face the former IBF featherweight champion Lee Selby in an IBF lightweight title eliminator on 26 March 2022, at the Estadio Luna Park in Buenos Aires, Argentina. He won the fight by a fifth-round technical knockout. Selby was knocked down twice prior to the stoppage, once in the fourth and once in the fifth round.

On 6 April 2024 in Las Vegas, Lemos was scheduled to face Richardson Hitchins in the IBF super lightweight title eliminator. He lost the fight via unanimous decision.

On 22 August 2024 it was reported that Lemos would face Keyshawn Davis on 8 November 2024 at Scope Arena in Norfolk, Virginia. Lemos lost the fight by TKO in the second round.

== Professional boxing record ==
31 fights	29 wins	2 losses
By knockout	19	1
By decision	10	1

No.	Result	Record	Opponent	Type	Round, time	Date	Location	Notes
31	Loss	29–2	Keyshawn Davis	KO	2 (10), 1:08	8 November 2024	Scope Arena, Norfolk, Virginia, U.S.	For WBO and vacant IBF Inter-Continental lightweight titles
30	Loss	29–1	Richardson Hitchins	UD	12	6 April 2024	Fontainebleau Las Vegas, Paradise, Nevada, U.S.	
29	Win	29–0	Javier Jose Claveri	TKO	1 (10)	15 December 2023	Estadio Luna Park, Buenos Aires, Argentina	
28	Win	28–0	Lee Selby	TKO	5 (12), 2:04	26 March 2022	Estadio Luna Park, Buenos Aires, Argentina	
27	Win	27–0	Maximiliano Ricardo Veron	TKO	8 (10)	17 April 2021	Polideportivo Jose Arijon, Desvio Arijon, Argentina	Retained IBF Latino super lightweight title
26	Win	26–0	Demian Daniel Fernandez	TKO	1 (10)	20 February 2021	Club Talleres, Arroyo Seco, Argentina	Retained IBF Latino super lightweight title
25	Win	25–0	Jakmani Hurtado	TKO	2 (10)	18 December 2020	Asociacion Bomberos Voluntarios de Zavalla, Zavalla, Argentina	Won vacant IBF Latino super lightweight title
24	Win	24–0	Yeison Gonzalez	TKO	2 (10)	23 November 2019	Polideportivo Municipal, Pinamar, Argentina	Retained IBF Youth lightweight title
23	Win	23–0	Jonathan Jose Eniz	TKO	2 (10)	23 August 2019	Estadio F.A.B., Buenos Aires, Argentina	Won vacant IBF Youth lightweight title
22	Win	22–0	Pedro Verdu	TKO	5 (10)	18 May 2019	Club Huracán, Tres Arroyos, Argentina	Retained IBF Latino lightweight title
21	Win	21–0	Jorge Paez Jr	KO	2 (10)	30 March 2019	Club Huracán, Tres Arroyos, Argentina	
20	Win	20–0	Galvis Guerra	KO	4 (10)	12 January 2019	Estadio Municipal, Perez, Argentina	Retained IBF Latino lightweight title
19	Win	19–0	Uriel Perez	UD	10	13 October 2018	Estadio José María Gatica, Villa Dominico, Argentina	
18	Win	18–0	Nestor Armas	TKO	4 (10)	24 August 2018	Club Huracán, Tres Arroyos, Argentina	Retained IBF Latino lightweight title
17	Win	17–0	Miguel German Acosta	TKO	3 (10)	21 July 2018	Estadio F.A.B,, Buenos Aires, Argentina	Won IBF Latino lightweight title
16	Win	16–0	Carlos Andres Chaparro	TKO	7 (8)	7 July 2018	Club Quilmes, Tres Arroyos, Argentina	
15	Win	15–0	Damian Leonardo Yapur	KO	5 (10)	24 March 2018	Club Huracán, Tres Arroyos, Argentina	Retained IBF Latino super lightweight title
14	Win	14–0	Ruben Dario Lopez	KO	4 (10)	26 January 2018	Club Talleres, Arroyo Seco, Argentina	Won vacant IBF Latino super lightweight title
13	Win	13–0	Gustavo Armando Pereyra	UD	8	22 December 2017	Federación Jujeña de Básquetbol, San Salvador de Jujuy, Argentina	
12	Win	12–0	Jonathan Ariel Sosa	UD	8	17 November 2017	Estadio José María Gatica, Villa Dominico, Argentina	
11	Win	11–0	Nelson Fabian Pilotti	TKO	5 (8)	6 October 2017	Club Huracán, Tres Arroyos, Argentina	
10	Win	10–0	Fernando Cancino	UD	6	14 July 2017	Club de Pelota Tres Arroyos, Tres Arroyos, Argentina	
9	Win	9–0	Emiliano Leonel Araujo	UD	6	16 June 2017	Ce.De.M. N° 2, Caseros, Argentina	
8	Win	8–0	Carlos Andres Chaparro	UD	6	18 March 2017	Gimnasio Futbol Club, Vera, Argentina	
7	Win	7–0	Walter Fernando Coman	TKO	3 (6)	18 February 2017	Club Social y Deportivo Mar de Ajó, Mar de Ajo, Argentina	
6	Win	6–0	Luis Miguel Ojeda	UD	4	16 December 2016	Parque Industrial de Desarrollo Productivo, Moreno, Argentina	
5	Win	5–0	Gustavo Adrian Ojeda	TKO	4 (4)	4 November 2016	Estadio F.A.B., Buenos Aires, Argentina	
4	Win	4–0	Cesar Alejandro Perez	UD	4	8 October 2016	Asociación Atlética Jorge Newbery, Rufino, Argentina	
3	Win	3–0	Jairo Alejandro Tosoratto	UD	4	9 September 2016	Ce.De.M. N° 2, Caseros, Argentina	
2	Win	2–0	Elias Moises Trossero	TKO	2 (4)	15 July 2016	Club Comunicaciones, Pergamino, Argentina	
1	Win	1–0	Lucio Alberto Ayala	UD	4	7 May 2016	Estadio F.A.B., Buenos Aires, Argentina	
