= Yomar Álamo =

Puerto Rican boxer

Personal information
- Nickname: The Magic
- Nationality: Puerto Rican
- Born: 6 March 1995 (age 31)
- Weight: Light welterweight

Boxing career
- Stance: Orthodox

Boxing record
- Total fights: 29
- Wins: 22
- Win by KO: 13
- Losses: 6
- Draws: 1

Yomar Álamo (born 6 March 1995) is a Puerto Rican professional boxer who has held the WBO–NABO light welterweight title since 2019. As of June 2020, he is ranked as the world's sixth best active light welterweight by the WBO.

== Professional career ==
Álamo made his professional debut on 27 April 2013, defeating Carlos Acevedo via first-round technical knockout (TKO) in under a minute in Caguas, Puerto Rico. He signed an exclusive promotional contract with Miguel Cotto Promotions and H2 Entertainment the following month, although he would soon switch to Carlos Maldonado's Black Tiger Promotions. He won the WBC FECARBOX light welterweight title in his eleventh fight, a second-round TKO of Edgardo Rivera in his hometown of Aguas Buenas on 13 August 2016. It was the first WBC fight ever held in the city, and his younger brother Yamil debuted earlier on the card with a victory. He successfully retained the belt two months later against veteran fighter Edwin López at the Roberto Clemente Coliseum in San Juan after his opponent failed to answer the bell for the second round.

In 2017 Álamo had two fights: he beat journeyman Juan Carlos Contreras in Santo Domingo, his first contest outside his home nation, and then knocked out Hungarian prospect Zsigmond Vass in the first round in Aguas Buenas to collect the vacant WBC Youth light welterweight title. The latter made history again as it was the first WBC Youth title fight ever held in Puerto Rico, and was attended by WBC president Mauricio Sulaimán for the occasion. After this he signed with Miami-based promoter Felix "Tutico" Zabala Jr. and his All Star Promotions in early 2018, and had a non-title victory over Colombian rival Wilfrido Buelvas at the Kissimmee Civic Center in Kissimmee, Florida that July. He also began training under former two-division world champion Iván Calderón in Guaynabo.

On 22 February 2019 he received a shot at the vacant WBO–NABO light welterweight title, facing "La Tormenta" Manuel Méndez, again in Kissimmee, in the main event of a card celebrating the 30th anniversary of the Boxeo Telemundo series on the Spanish-language network. Álamo won the belt with a ten round unanimous decision victory (100–90, 99–91, 99–91) that moved him to 16–0. At a title celebration in his hometown of Aguas Buenas a few days later, he was given an award of recognition by mayor Javier García Pérez on behalf of the House of Representatives of Puerto Rico. His first title defence was set to be against Mexican fighter Miguel Angel Martínez, but Martínez was pulled from the show to be plugged into another card as a replacement. He instead faced Salvador Briceño in August 2019 and scored his second straight unanimous decision victory (98–92, 98–92, 96–94). Two months later he fought Antonio Morán to a ten-round split draw (97–93, 95–95, 94–96) in a Boxeo Telemundo main event, retaining again but suffering the first blemish on his undefeated record.

Álamo matched up against undefeated Mexican-American prospect Kendo Castañeda in another Boxeo Telemundo headliner on 28 February 2020, making his third defence of the NABO light welterweight title. Before the fight, Castañeda said that Álamo had only fought taxicab drivers and he would turn him into one. The Puerto Rican went on to defeat the San Antonio native by majority decision (98–92, 97–93, 95–95), prompting a further push to #6 in the WBO rankings.

== Professional boxing record ==
29 fights	22 wins	6 losses
By knockout	13	2
By decision	9	4
Draws	1	

No.	Result	Record	Opponent	Type	Round, time	Date	Location	Notes
29	Loss	22–6–1	(Colombia) Jhon Orobio	KO	5 (10), 0:45	5 Mar 2026	Montreal Casino, Montreal, Quebec, Canada	For WBC Continental Americas light welterweight title
28	Loss	22–5–1	(United States) Breyon Gorham	UD	10	20 Sep 2025	(United States) Bayou Music Center, Houston, Texas, U.S.	For vacant IBF North American light welterweight title
27	Loss	22–4–1	(United States) Jamaine Ortiz	UD	10	15 Mar 2025	(United States) Caribe Royale Orlando, Orlando, Florida, U.S.	
26	Loss	22–3–1	(United States) Delante Johnson	UD	8	27 Sep 2024	(United States) Madison Square Garden Theater, New York, New York, U.S.	
25	Win	22–2–1	(Puerto Rico) Jayson Velez	UD	8	19 Jul 2024	Coliseo Mario Morales, Guaynabo, Puerto Rico	
24	Win	21–2–1	(Dominican Republic) Adriano Porfirio Ramirez	KO	1 (8), 0:30	24 Feb 2024	Coliseo Samuel Rodríguez, Aguas Buenas, Puerto Rico	
23	Loss	20–2–1	(United States) Richardson Hitchins	RTD	8 (10), 3:00	12 Nov 2022	(United States) Rocket Mortgage FieldHouse, Cleveland, Ohio, U.S.	For vacant IBF North American light welterweight title
22	Loss	20–1–1	(Australia) Liam Paro	SD	10	18 Dec 2021	(United States) Amalie Arena, Tampa, Florida, U.S.	
21	Win	20–0–1	(Mexico) Adrian Yung	UD	10	13 Aug 2021	(United States) Osceola Heritage Park, Kissimmee, Florida, U.S.	Retained WBO Latino light welterweight title
20	Win	19–0–1	(Mexico) Jesús Alberto Beltrán	UD	10	5 Mar 2021	(United States) Osceola Heritage Park, Kissimmee, Florida, U.S.	Won vacant WBO Latino light welterweight title
19	Win	18–0–1	(United States) Kendo Castañeda	MD	10	28 Feb 2020	(United States) Osceola Heritage Park, Kissimmee, Florida, U.S.	Retained WBO–NABO light welterweight title
18	Draw	17–0–1	(Mexico) Antonio Morán	SD	10	4 Oct 2019	(United States) Osceola Heritage Park, Kissimmee, Florida, U.S.	Retained WBO–NABO light welterweight title
17	Win	17–0	(Mexico) Salvador Briceño	UD	10	2 Aug 2019	(United States) Osceola Heritage Center, Kissimmee, Florida, U.S.	Retained WBO–NABO light welterweight title
16	Win	16–0	(United States) Manuel Méndez	UD	10	22 Feb 2019	(United States) Osceola Heritage Center, Kissimmee, Florida, U.S.	Won vacant WBO–NABO light welterweight title
15	Win	15–0	(Colombia) Wilfrido Buelvas	KO	4 (6), 0:28	28 Jul 2018	(United States) Kissimmee Civic Center, Kissimmee, Florida, U.S.	
14	Win	14–0	(Hungary) Zsigmond Vass	KO	1 (10), 1:02	19 Aug 2017	Coliseo Samuel Rodríguez, Aguas Buenas, Puerto Rico	Won vacant WBC Youth light welterweight title
13	Win	13–0	(Dominican Republic) Juan Carlos Contreras	TKO	1 (6), 1:48	12 Feb 2017	Casa de los Clubes, Santo Domingo, Dominican Republic	
12	Win	12–0	(Puerto Rico) Edwin López	RTD	1 (8), 3:00	29 Oct 2016	Roberto Clemente Coliseum, San Juan, Puerto Rico	Retained WBC FECARBOX light welterweight title
11	Win	11–0	(Puerto Rico) Edgardo Rivera	TKO	2 (8), 1:43	13 Aug 2016	Coliseo Samuel Rodríguez, Aguas Buenas, Puerto Rico	Won vacant WBC FECARBOX light welterweight title
10	Win	10–0	(Puerto Rico) Gabriel Díaz	UD	6	5 Jun 2016	Coliseo Cosme Beitia Salamo, Cataño, Puerto Rico	
9	Win	9–0	(Puerto Rico) Gabriel Díaz	UD	6	6 Feb 2016	Coliseo Roger L. Mendoza, Caguas, Puerto Rico	
8	Win	8–0	(Puerto Rico) Roberto Rivera Sevilla	TKO	4 (6), 2:51	14 Nov 2015	Auditorio Municipal, Comerío, Puerto Rico	
7	Win	7–0	(Puerto Rico) Enrique Quinones	KO	1 (4), 2:50	8 Aug 2015	Coliseo Héctor Solá Bezares, Caguas, Puerto Rico	
6	Win	6–0	(Puerto Rico) Bryan Montalvo	UD	4	14 Mar 2015	Coliseo Roger L. Mendoza, Caguas, Puerto Rico	
5	Win	5–0	(Puerto Rico) Víctor Vega	KO	1 (4), 2:15	22 Mar 2014	Coliseo Roger L. Mendoza, Caguas, Puerto Rico	
4	Win	4–0	(Puerto Rico) Héctor Velez	TKO	1 (4), 2:21	1 Feb 2014	Coliseo Roger L. Mendoza, Caguas, Puerto Rico	
3	Win	3–0	(Puerto Rico) Reymundo Santiago	TKO	1 (4), 0:52	26 Oct 2013	Coliseo Rafael G. Amalbert, Juncos, Puerto Rico	
2	Win	2–0	(Puerto Rico) Luis Ortiz Medina	TKO	1 (4), 1:32	31 Aug 2013	Coliseo Roger L. Mendoza, Caguas, Puerto Rico	
1	Win	1–0	(Puerto Rico) Carlos Acevedo	TKO	1 (4), 0:47	27 Apr 2013	Coliseo Roger L. Mendoza, Caguas, Puerto Rico	
