= Liam Paro =

Australian boxer (born 1996)

Personal information
- Born: Liam Robert Paro; 16 April 1996 (age 30) Mackay, Queensland, Australia
- Height: 5 ft 8 1/2 in (174 cm)
- Weight: Light welterweight; Welterweight

Boxing career
- Reach: 71 in (180 cm)
- Stance: Southpaw

Boxing record
- Total fights: 29
- Wins: 28
- Win by KO: 16
- Losses: 1

Liam Robert Paro (born 16 April 1996) is an Australian professional boxer. He is a world champion in two weight classes, having held the International Boxing Federation (IBF) welterweight title since June 2026, and previously the IBF light-welterweight title in 2024.

== Early life ==
Paro was born and raised in Mackay, Queensland to a family of Italian descent. His first sporting interest came in the form of rugby league where he played for the North Mackay Magpies in the local junior competition. At 13 years of age, he was introduced to the sport of boxing and gave up playing rugby league to focus solely on pursuing a professional career in boxing. In pursuit of higher levels of training, Paro moved to Townsville at 17 years of age before settling in Brisbane as a 20-year-old, where he would regularly train with the likes of future world champion Jeff Horn in the lead up to his monumental victory over legendary Filipino boxer Manny Pacquiao.

== Professional boxing career ==
=== Paro vs. Álamo ===
In his international debut, Paro travelled to Tampa where he was victorious over undefeated Puerto Rican Yomar Álamo via split decision on the Jake Paul vs. Tyron Woodley II undercard.

=== IBF Light-welterweight Champion ===
==== Paro vs. Matias ====
On 4 February 2024 it was reported that Liam Paro would challenge Subriel Matias for his IBF light-welterweight title in the summer 2024 in Puerto Rico. On 27 March 2024 the fight was confirmed for 15 June 2024 in Manatí, Puerto Rico. Paro won the fight by unanimous decision.

==== Paro vs. Hitchins ====
On 27 August 2024 it was announced that Paro was expected to make the first defense of his IBF light-welterweight title on 7 December 2024, at a venue in Brisbane, Sydney or Adelaide. Devin Haney was a potential opponent. On 3 October 2024, it was announced that Paro would face Richardson Hitchins in San Juan, Puerto Rico. He lost the fight and his title by split decision with two ringside judges scoring the bout 116–112 for Hitchins while the third had it 117–111 for Paro.

=== Welterweight ===
Paro was scheduled to face unbeaten David Papot in an eliminator for a shot at the IBF welterweight title at the Pat Rafter Arena in Brisbane, Australia, on 18 September 2025. Paro won the fight by unanimous decision.

He challenged IBF welterweight champion Lewis Crocker at Rafter Arena in Brisbane, on 24 June 2026, winning via unanimous decision.

== Professional boxing record ==
29 fights	28 wins	1 loss
By knockout	16	0
By decision	12	1

No.	Result	Record	Opponent	Type	Round, time	Date	Location	Notes
29	Win	28–1	Lewis Crocker	UD	12	24 Jun 2026	Pat Rafter Arena, Tennyson, Queensland, Australia	Won IBF welterweight title
28	Win	27–1	David Papot	UD	12	18 Sep 2025	Pat Rafter Arena, Tennyson, Queensland, Australia	
27	Win	26–1	Jonathan Navarro	RTD	5 (10), 3:00	25 June 2025	Cairns Convention Centre, Cairns, Queensland, Australia	
26	Loss	25–1	Richardson Hitchins	SD	12	7 Dec 2024	Roberto Clemente Coliseum, San Juan, Puerto Rico	Lost IBF light-welterweight title
25	Win	25–0	Subriel Matías	UD	12	15 Jun 2024	Coliseo Juan Aubin Cruz Abreu, Manatí, Puerto Rico	Won IBF light-welterweight title
24	Win	24–0	Montana Love	KO	6 (10), 1:49	9 Dec 2023	Chase Center, San Francisco, California, US	Retained WBO Global light-welterweight title
23	Win	23–0	Brock Jarvis	TKO	1 (12), 2:29	15 Oct 2022	South Bank Piazza, Brisbane, Australia	Retained WBO Global light-welterweight title
22	Win	22–0	Yomar Álamo	SD	10	18 Dec 2021	Amalie Arena, Tampa, Florida, US	
21	Win	21–0	Steve Gago	UD	10	24 Jul 2021	Eatons Hill Hotel, Brisbane, Australia	Retained IBF International and WBO Global light-welterweight titles
20	Win	20–0	Terry Tzouramanis	TKO	7 (10), 3:00	5 Mar 2021	Eatons Hill Hotel, Brisbane, Australia	Retained IBF International and WBO Global light-welterweight titles
19	Win	19–0	James Chereji	TKO	8 (10), 1:18	7 Mar 2020	The Star, Gold Coast, Australia	Retained IBF International and WBO Global light-welterweight titls
18	Win	18–0	Hwang Kil Kim	UD	10	8 Nov 2019	Eatons Hill Hotel, Brisbane, Australia	Retained WBO Global light-welterweight title
17	Win	17–0	Fatih Keleş	UD	10	8 Jun 2019	The Star, Gold Coast, Australia	Retained WBO Global light-welterweight title; Won vacant IBF International light-welterweight title
16	Win	16–0	Massimiliano Ballisai	UD	10	16 Feb 2019	Entertainment & Convention Centre, Mackay, Australia	Won inaugural WBO Global light-welterweight title
15	Win	15–0	Robert Tlatlik	TKO	7 (10), 3:00	13 Oct 2018	Convention & Exhibition Centre, Brisbane, Australia	
14	Win	14–0	Sebastian Bytyqi	TKO	2 (10), 2:01	19 May 2018	Southport Australian Football Club, Gold Coast, Australia	Won vacant WBO Youth light-welterweight title
13	Win	13–0	Andrew Wallace	RTD	3 (10), 3:00	17 Mar 2018	Mansfield Tavern, Brisbane, Australia	Won vacant Australian light-welterweight title
12	Win	12–0	Kurt Finlayson	RTD	3 (5), 3:00	3 Feb 2018	Hurstville Entertainment Centre, Sydney, Australia	
11	Win	11–0	Komkit Chanawong	UD	5	4 Nov 2017	Entertainment and Convention Centre, Townsville, Australia	
10	Win	10–0	Jose Aubel	TKO	3 (8), 1:02	23 Sep 2017	Eatons Hill Hotel, Brisbane, Australia	
9	Win	9–0	Nic Aratema	TKO	3 (6), 2:32	25 Aug 2017	Melbourne Pavilion, Melbourne, Australia	
8	Win	8–0	Simon Rendina	KO	1 (4), 2:55	15 Jul 2017	Wests City, Newcastle, Australia	
7	Win	7–0	Alex Ah Tong	KO	4 (6), 0:54	10 Jun 2017	Mansfield Tavern, Brisbane, Australia	
6	Win	6–0	Daniel Maxwell	TKO	5 (6), 1:22	4 Feb 2017	McDonald's Multisports Stadium, Mackay, Australia	
5	Win	5–0	Nick Hikuroa	TKO	1 (6), 1:34	3 Dec 2016	Mansfield Tavern, Brisbane, Australia	
4	Win	4–0	John Min	TKO	1 (4), 1:45	1 Oct 2016	The MET, Brisbane, Australia	
3	Win	3–0	Aphichat Koedchatturat	MD	4	9 Sep 2016	Mansfield Tavern, Brisbane, Australia	
2	Win	2–0	Arnon Yucharoen	UD	4	15 Apr 2016	Tattersalls Club, Brisbane, Australia	
1	Win	1–0	Jacob Mahony	UD	4	5 Mar 2016	Mansfield Tavern, Brisbane, Australia	

== Titles in boxing ==
=== Major world titles ===
- IBF light-welterweight champion (140 lbs)
- IBF welterweight champion (147 lbs)

=== Regional/International titles ===
- Australian light-welterweight champion (140 lbs)
- IBF International light-welterweight champion (140 lbs)
- WBO Youth light-welterweight champion (140 lbs)
- WBO Global light-welterweight champion (140 lbs)

== See also ==
- List of male boxers
- Boxing in Australia
- List of southpaw stance boxers
- List of world light-welterweight boxing champions
- List of world welterweight boxing champions

Sporting positions
Regional boxing titles
Vacant Title last held by Kye MacKenzie	Australian light-welterweight champion 17 March 2018 – 2018; Vacated	Vacant Title next held by Steve Spark
Vacant Title last held by Georgii Chelokhsaev	WBO Youth light-welterweight champion 19 May 2018 – 16 February 2019; Won global title	Vacant Title next held by Jose Luis Rodriguez Guerrero
New title	WBO Global light-welterweight champion 16 February 2019 – 15 June 2024; Won world title	Vacant Title next held by Aram Faniian
Vacant Title last held by Steve Claggett	IBF International light-welterweight champion 8 June 2019 – 2022; Vacated	Vacant Title next held by Bastien Ballesta
World boxing titles
Preceded by Subriel Matías	IBF light-welterweight champion 15 June – 7 December 2024	Succeeded by Richardson Hitchins
Preceded by Lewis Crocker	IBF welterweight champion 24 June 2026 – present	Incumbent
