= Raúl Curiel =

Mexican boxer (born 1995)

Personal information
- Nickname: Cugar
- Born: 6 December 1995 (age 30) Tampico, Tamaulipas, Mexico
- Height: 5 ft 8 in (173 cm)
- Weight: Light middleweight

Boxing career
- Reach: 70 in (178 cm)

Boxing record
- Total fights: 19
- Wins: 18
- Win by KO: 14
- Losses: 0
- Draws: 1
Medal record
Men's amateur boxing
Representing Mexico
Youth World Championships
Silver medal – second place	2012 Yerevan	Lightweight
Central American and Caribbean Games
Bronze medal – third place	2014 Veracruz	Light welterweight

Raúl Curiel Garcia (born 6 December 1995) is a Mexican professional boxer. He qualified for the men's light welterweight competition at the 2016 Summer Olympics through his top two AIBA Pro Boxing ranking but was unable to compete because of stomach flu.

== Professional career ==
Curiel faced Alexis Rocha in a welterweight bout at the Toyota Arena in Ontario, California, USA, on 14 December 2024. The fight ended in a majority draw.

A rematch was set up to take place at Acrisure Arena in Palm Desert, California, USA, on 16 January 2026. However, Rocha withdrew the day before the contest after being hospitalised due to complications with his weight cut. Jordan Panthen was brought in as a last minute replacement. Curiel defeated Pantheon via unanimous decision.

Curiel defeated Quinton Randall by unanimous decision at The Theater at Virgin Hotels in Las Vegas, Nevada, USA, on 1 August 2026.

== Professional boxing record ==
19 fights	18 wins	0 losses
By knockout	14	0
By decision	4	0
Draws	1	

No.	Result	Record	Opponent	Type	Round, time	Date	Location	Notes
19	Win	18–0–1	Quinton Randall	MD	10	1 Aug 2026	The Theater at Virgin Hotels, Paradise, Nevada, U.S.	Retained WBC-NABF welterweight title
18	Win	17–0–1	Jordan Panthen	UD	10	16 Jan 2026	Acrisure Arena, Palm Desert, California, U.S.	
17	Win	16–0–1	Victor Ezequiel Rodriguez	KO	4 (10), 2:09	28 June 2025	Honda Center, Anaheim, California, U.S.	Retained WBC-NABF welterweight title
16	Draw	15–0–1	Alexis Rocha	MD	12	14 Dec 2024	Toyota Arena, Ontario, California, U.S.	Retained WBC-NABF welterweight title; For WBO-NABO welterweight title
15	Win	15–0	Jorge Marron Jr	KO	1 (10), 1:31	27 April 2024	Save Mart Arena, Fresno, California, U.S.	Retained WBC-NABF welterweight title
14	Win	14–0	Elias Diaz	TKO	8 (10), 1:06	6 Jan 2024	Virgin Hotels, Las Vegas, Nevada, U.S.	Retained WBC-NABF welterweight title
13	Win	13–0	Courtney Pennington	KO	10 (10), 2:53	7 Sept 2023	Fantasy Springs Resort & Casino, Indio, California, U.S.	Retained WBC-NABF welterweight title
12	Win	12–0	Brad Solomon	KO	2 (10), 0:44	17 Dec 2022	Commerce Casino, Commerce, California, U.S.	Retained WBC-NABF welterweight title
11	Win	11–0	Kendo Castaneda	KO	7 (10), 1:20	18 Dec 2021	AT&T Center, San Antonio, Texas, U.S.	Retained WBC-NABF welterweight title
10	Win	10–0	Ferdinand Karobyan	KO	9 (10), 2:24	19 Jun 2021	Don Haskins Center, El Paso, Texas, U.S.	Won vacant WBC-NABF welterweight title
9	Win	9–0	Ramses Agaton	TKO	2 (8), 1:18	2 Jan 2021	American Airlines Center, Dallas, Texas, U.S.	
8	Win	8–0	Jeremy Ramos	KO	7 (8), 1:15	24 Oct 2019	Fantasy Springs Resort Casino, Indio, California, U.S.	
7	Win	7–0	Alphonso Black	KO	6 (6), 0:51	22 Aug 2019	Fantasy Springs Resort Casino, Indio, California, U.S.	
6	Win	6–0	Andrew Rodgers	RTD	2 (6), 3:00	25 Apr 2019	Fantasy Springs Resort Casino, Indio, California, U.S.	
5	Win	5–0	Ryan Pino	UD	6	13 Sep 2018	Hard Rock Hotel and Casino, Paradise, Nevada, U.S.	
4	Win	4–0	Demetrius Wilson	KO	2 (6), 2:13	6 July 2018	Belasco Theatre, Los Angeles, California, U.S.	
3	Win	3–0	Quantavious Green	KO	2 (6), 1:29	22 Mar 2018	Fantasy Springs Resort Casino, Indio, California, U.S.	
2	Win	2–0	Israel Villela	KO	4 (4), 2:23	14 Dec 2017	Fantasy Springs Resort Casino, Indio, California, U.S.	
1	Win	1–0	Jesus Sanchez Quiroz	MD	4	6 May 2017	T-Mobile Arena, Paradise, Nevada, U.S.	
