= Welterweight =

Weight class in combat sports

Welterweight is a weight class in combat sports. Originally the term welterweight was used only in boxing, but other combat sports like muay Thai, taekwondo, and mixed martial arts also use it for their own weight division system to classify the opponents. If used, welterweight is typically between lightweight and middleweight.

== Etymology ==
The first known instance of the term is from 1831, meaning 'heavyweight horseman', later 'boxer or wrestler of a certain weight' by 1896. This sense comes from earlier welter, 'heavyweight horseman or boxer' from 1804, possibly from c. 15th century welt, meaning 'to beat severely'.

== Boxing ==
=== Professional boxing ===
A professional welterweight boxer's weight is greater than 140 pounds, and no more than 147 pounds (about 63.5–66.7 kg).

==== Current world champions ====
Current champions

Sanctioning body	Reign began	Champion	Record	Defenses
WBA	August 22, 2026	Teofimo Lopez	23–2 (13 KO)	0
WBC	February 21, 2026	Ryan Garcia	26–2–0–1 (21 KO)	1
IBF	June 24, 2026	Liam Paro	28–1 (16 KO)	0
WBO	November 22, 2025	Devin Haney	33–0–0–1 (15 KO)	0

==== Current world rankings ====
===== The Ring =====
As of February 28, 2026.

Keys:

C Current The Ring world champion

Rank	Name	Record	Title(s)
C	vacant		
1	Devin Haney	33–0 (1) (15 KO)	WBO
2	Brian Norman Jr.	28–1 (22 KO)	
3	Eimantas Stanionis	16–1 (1) (9 KO)	
4	Ryan Garcia	25–2 (1) (20 KO)	WBC
5	Rolando Romero	17–3 (13 KO)	WBA
6	Rohan Polanco	17–0 (10 KO)	
7	Shakhram Giyasov	18–0 (11 KO)	
8	Raúl Curiel	17–0–1 (14 KO)	
9	Jack Catterall	32–2 (14 KO)	
10	Tiger Johnson	16–0 (7 KO)	

===== BoxRec =====
As of 28 February 2026.

Rank	Name	Record	Title(s)
1	Devin Haney	33–0 (1) (15 KO)	WBO
2	Liam Paro	28–1 (16 KO)	IBF
3	Brian Norman Jr.	28–1 (1) (22 KO)	
4	Jack Catterall	32–2 (14 KO)	
5	Rohan Polanco	17–0 (10 KO)	
6	Karen Chukhadzhian	26–3 (14 KO)	
7	Rolando Romero	17–2 (13 KO)	WBA
8	Vadim Musaev	14–0 (9 KO)	
9	Ryan Garcia	25–2 (1) (20 KO)	WBC
10	Julian Rodriguez	25–1 (15 KO)	

==== Longest-reigning world welterweight champions ====
Below is a list of longest-reigning welterweight champions in boxing measured by the individual's longest reign. Career-total time as champion (for multiple-time champions) does not apply.

	Name	Title reign	Title recognition	Successful defenses	Beaten opponents	Fights
1.	Felix Trinidad	8 years, 3 months and 6 days	IBF	15	15	
2.	Terence Crawford	6 years, 2 months, 14 days	WBO	7	7	
3.	Errol Spence Jr.	6 years, 2 months and 3 days	IBF, WBC	6	5	
4.	Antonio Margarito	5 years, 3 months, 28 days	WBO	7	7	
5.	Ike Quartey	4 years, 7 months, 30 days	WBA	7	7	
6.	Freddie Cochrane	4 years, 7 months, 03 days	NYSAC, NBA	0	0	
7.	José Nápoles	4 years, 6 months, 2 days	WBA, WBC	10	8	
8.	Sugar Ray Robinson	4 years, 1 month, 26 days	NYSAC, NBA	5	5	
9.	Floyd Mayweather Jr.	4 years, 1 month, 18 days	WBC	5	4	
10.	Pernell Whitaker	4 years, 1 month, 6 days	WBC	8	7	
11.	Pipino Cuevas	4 years and 16 days	WBA	11	10	

==== Top 10 most title defenses ====
Below is a list of most title defenses by welterweight champions in boxing measured by the individual's reign with the most title defenses. Career-total title defenses as champion (for multiple-time champions) does not apply.

	Name	Title reign	Title recognition	Successful defenses	Beaten opponents	Fights
1.	Henry Armstrong	2 years, 4 months, 3 days	NYSAC, NBA, Ring	19	15	
2.	Félix Trinidad	6 years, 8 months, 14 days	IBF	15	15	
3.	Pipino Cuevas	4 years and 16 days	WBA	11	10	
4.	José Nápoles	4 years, 6 months, 2 days	WBA, WBC, Ring	10	8	
5.	Jack Britton	3 years, 7 months, 13 days	World	9	8	
6.	Pernell Whitaker	4 years, 1 month, 6 days	WBC	8	7	
7.	Simon Brown	3 years, 7 months, 6 days	IBF	8	8	
8.	Kid Gavilán	3 years, 5 months, 2 days	NYSAC, NBA, Ring	7	6	
9.	Donald Curry	3 years, 7 months, 14 days	WBA	7	7	
10.	Ike Quartey	4 years, 7 months, 30 days	WBA	7	7	

=== Amateur boxing ===
==== Olympic champions ====
The current Olympic male welterweight division is set at 63.5–71 kg (140–157 lb).

== Kickboxing ==
The weight division system is different in each organisation, so the kickboxing weight divisions of some international organizations vary:

- International Kickboxing Federation (IKF), welterweight (Pro & Amateur) 142.1–147 lb or 64.5–66.7 kg.
- International Sport Karate Association (ISKA), welterweight 142.1–147 lb or 64.5–66.7 kg.
- World Kickboxing Association (WKA), welterweight (Pro) upper limit 147.7 lb or 67.0 kg.
- In Glory promotion, a welterweight division is up to 170 lb or 77 kg.
- ONE Championship, welterweight upper limit 83.9 kg (185 lb).

== Bare-knuckle boxing ==
The limit for welterweight generally differs among promotions in bare-knuckle boxing:

- In Bare Knuckle Fighting Championship, the welterweight division has an upper limit of 165 lb (75 kg).
- In BKB™, the welterweight division has an upper limit of 83 kg (183 lb).

== Wrestling ==
=== Olympic wrestling ===
Prior to 1996, the weight limit for welterweight was 74 kg/163 lb in Olympic wrestling. Since that time, amateur wrestling has named its weight classes by upper weight limit in kilograms.

=== Professional wrestling ===
In the United States and Canada, there was a 145 lb limit in the early 20th century at least until the early 1920s. In Mexico, the wrestling commission's definition of the welterweight weight class is between 70 kg (150 lb) and 78 kg (172 lb).

In the United Kingdom, the 1947 Admiral-Lord Mountevans rules set out seven weight divisions with maximum weight limits and called for champions to be crowned of each limit. This included Welterweight 11st 11 lb (165 lb or ~75 kg) An earlier system of weight classes with different levels and more divisions - including Welterweight - existed under the 1930 All-In rules.

=== Catch wrestling ===
From the 1870s to the 1910s, the weight limit was 10st 8 lb (148 lb) for Lancashire catch-as-catch-can wrestling under the rules of Sporting Chronicle (Manchester, England).

== Mixed martial arts ==
The welterweight limit, as defined by the Nevada State Athletic Commission and the Association of Boxing Commissions is 155 to 170 lb (70.3 to 77.1 kg).

=== Current champions ===
This table is not always up to date. Last updated September 15th 2026

Organization	Reign began	Champion	Record	Title defenses
UFC	November 15, 2025	(Russia) Islam Makhachev	29–1 (5KO 13SUB)	1
Professional Fighters League	July 25, 2026	(United States) Thad Jean	12–0 (6KO 1SUB)	0
ONE Championship	November 19, 2022	(United States) Christian Lee	18–4 (13KO 4SUB)	1
Fight Nights Global	April 6, 2019	(Russia) Dmitry Bikrev	16–4 (11KO 1SUB)	3
KSW	April 22, 2023	(Poland) Adrian Bartosiński	16–1 (11KO 2SUB)	3
Titan FC	June 2, 2023	(United States) Will Brooks	26–5 (7KO 6SUB)	1
ACA	Dec 5, 2025	(Kyrgyzstan) Zhakshylyk Myrzabekov	15–2 (6KO 2SUB)	4
Legacy Fighting Alliance	May 21, 2026	Vacant		0
Cage Warriors	April 26, 2025	(England) Justin Burlinson	10-2 (3KO 7SUB)	0

== Other sports ==
Other sports to include a welterweight division include the following:

- Muay Thai has fixed its weight division similarly to boxing.
  - International Kickboxing Federation (IKF): muay Thai welterweight (pro and amateur) 142.1-147 lb or 64.59-66.8 kg
  - World Muay Thai Council (WMC), welterweight range is from 140 to 147 lb or 63.5 to 66.6 kg
  - World Muay Thai Federation (WMF, the official amateur organization), fixed welterweight from 65.0 to 67.0 kg (143.3 to 147.7 lb) for adult and junior
- The official rules of shoot boxing define welterweights as between 65 and 67 kg (143 and 148 lb).
- In Olympic taekwondo, welterweight falls between 74 and 80 kg (163 and 176 lb). At the weight classes for the Olympic games it is between 68 and 80 kg (150 and 176 lb).
